This is a partial list of unnumbered minor planets for principal provisional designations assigned between 1 January and 31 December 1998. , a total of 549 bodies remain unnumbered for this period. Also see previous and next year.

A 

|- id="1998 AU2" bgcolor=#d6d6d6
| 0 ||  || MBA-O || 16.75 || 2.5 km || multiple || 1991–2021 || 11 Sep 2021 || 111 || align=left | Disc.: Spacewatch || 
|- id="1998 AN3" bgcolor=#d6d6d6
| 0 ||  || MBA-O || 16.85 || 2.4 km || multiple || 1998–2021 || 11 Jul 2021 || 80 || align=left | Disc.: SpacewatchAdded on 17 January 2021Alt.: 2015 FT18 || 
|- id="1998 AK10" bgcolor=#FA8072
| 6 ||  || MCA || 20.9 || data-sort-value="0.20" | 200 m || single || 33 days || 02 Feb 1998 || 26 || align=left | Disc.: Spacewatch || 
|- id="1998 AZ11" bgcolor=#fefefe
| 0 ||  || MBA-I || 18.31 || data-sort-value="0.65" | 650 m || multiple || 1998–2021 || 04 Oct 2021 || 131 || align=left | Disc.: SpacewatchAlt.: 2016 BK48 || 
|- id="1998 AA12" bgcolor=#fefefe
| 0 ||  || MBA-I || 18.72 || data-sort-value="0.54" | 540 m || multiple || 1998–2021 || 15 Apr 2021 || 42 || align=left | Disc.: Spacewatch || 
|}
back to top

B 

|- id="1998 BY7" bgcolor=#FFC2E0
| 0 ||  || APO || 21.47 || data-sort-value="0.18" | 180 m || multiple || 1998–2021 || 04 Aug 2021 || 156 || align=left | Disc.: SpacewatchPotentially hazardous object || 
|- id="1998 BT13" bgcolor=#FFC2E0
| 7 ||  || APO || 26.5 || data-sort-value="0.018" | 18 m || single || 6 days || 30 Jan 1998 || 15 || align=left | Disc.: Spacewatch || 
|- id="1998 BZ13" bgcolor=#fefefe
| 2 ||  || MBA-I || 19.4 || data-sort-value="0.45" | 410 m || multiple || 1998–2023 || 13 Mar 2023 || 37 || align=left | Disc.: SpacewatchAlt.: 2016 EF148 || 
|- id="1998 BK18" bgcolor=#fefefe
| 0 ||  || MBA-I || 18.4 || data-sort-value="0.62" | 620 m || multiple || 1998–2020 || 04 Jan 2020 || 38 || align=left | Disc.: Spacewatch || 
|- id="1998 BM18" bgcolor=#E9E9E9
| 0 ||  || MBA-M || 17.46 || data-sort-value="0.96" | 960 m || multiple || 1998–2021 || 28 Oct 2021 || 119 || align=left | Disc.: Spacewatch || 
|- id="1998 BJ21" bgcolor=#fefefe
| 0 ||  || MBA-I || 17.7 || data-sort-value="0.86" | 860 m || multiple || 1998–2020 || 23 Nov 2020 || 99 || align=left | Disc.: Spacewatch || 
|- id="1998 BN22" bgcolor=#fefefe
| 0 ||  = (619164) || MBA-I || 17.9 || data-sort-value="0.78" | 780 m || multiple || 1998–2020 || 18 Apr 2020 || 93 || align=left | Disc.: Spacewatch || 
|- id="1998 BV23" bgcolor=#E9E9E9
| 0 ||  || MBA-M || 17.57 || data-sort-value="0.91" | 910 m || multiple || 1998–2021 || 06 Nov 2021 || 110 || align=left | Disc.: Spacewatch || 
|- id="1998 BR26" bgcolor=#FFC2E0
| 7 ||  || APO || 26.0 || data-sort-value="0.022" | 22 m || single || 1 day || 31 Jan 1998 || 19 || align=left | Disc.: Spacewatch || 
|- id="1998 BJ28" bgcolor=#E9E9E9
| 2 ||  || MBA-M || 17.9 || 1.1 km || multiple || 1998–2020 || 14 Feb 2020 || 57 || align=left | Disc.: SpacewatchAdded on 22 July 2020Alt.: 2016 ET53 || 
|- id="1998 BB29" bgcolor=#d6d6d6
| 0 ||  || MBA-O || 16.92 || 2.3 km || multiple || 1998–2021 || 13 Apr 2021 || 92 || align=left | Disc.: SpacewatchAlt.: 2013 TG95, 2015 FV48 || 
|- id="1998 BE29" bgcolor=#d6d6d6
| 0 ||  || MBA-O || 16.71 || 2.5 km || multiple || 1998–2021 || 08 Sep 2021 || 97 || align=left | Disc.: SpacewatchAlt.: 2014 BF45 || 
|- id="1998 BJ29" bgcolor=#fefefe
| 0 ||  || MBA-I || 18.14 || data-sort-value="0.70" | 700 m || multiple || 1993–2020 || 15 Feb 2020 || 51 || align=left | Disc.: SpacewatchAdded on 21 August 2021Alt.: 2004 XU142 || 
|- id="1998 BN29" bgcolor=#fefefe
| 0 ||  || MBA-I || 18.05 || data-sort-value="0.73" | 730 m || multiple || 1998–2021 || 18 Mar 2021 || 53 || align=left | Disc.: SpacewatchAdded on 9 March 2021 || 
|- id="1998 BH31" bgcolor=#d6d6d6
| 0 ||  = (619165) || MBA-O || 16.4 || 2.9 km || multiple || 1998–2021 || 12 Aug 2021 || 83 || align=left | Disc.: SpacewatchAlt.: 2009 FM92 || 
|- id="1998 BC34" bgcolor=#FFE699
| 7 ||  || Asteroid || 20.8 || data-sort-value="0.39" | 390 m || single || 11 days || 02 Feb 1998 || 15 || align=left | Disc.: SpacewatchMCA at MPC || 
|- id="1998 BN34" bgcolor=#fefefe
| 0 ||  || MBA-I || 17.6 || data-sort-value="0.90" | 900 m || multiple || 1998–2021 || 04 Jan 2021 || 81 || align=left | Disc.: Spacewatch || 
|- id="1998 BT34" bgcolor=#d6d6d6
| 0 ||  || MBA-O || 16.9 || 2.3 km || multiple || 1998–2020 || 24 Jun 2020 || 101 || align=left | Disc.: Spacewatch || 
|- id="1998 BN35" bgcolor=#E9E9E9
| 0 ||  || MBA-M || 18.14 || data-sort-value="0.70" | 700 m || multiple || 1998–2021 || 11 Nov 2021 || 36 || align=left | Disc.: SpacewatchAlt.: 2015 KR61 || 
|- id="1998 BM39" bgcolor=#d6d6d6
| 0 ||  || MBA-O || 16.98 || 2.2 km || multiple || 1998–2020 || 22 Mar 2020 || 79 || align=left | Disc.: SpacewatchAdded on 22 July 2020 || 
|- id="1998 BX39" bgcolor=#E9E9E9
| 0 ||  = (619166) || MBA-M || 16.9 || 1.8 km || multiple || 1998–2020 || 21 Apr 2020 || 120 || align=left | Disc.: SpacewatchAlt.: 2015 AP66 || 
|- id="1998 BY39" bgcolor=#fefefe
| 0 ||  || MBA-I || 17.5 || data-sort-value="0.94" | 940 m || multiple || 1998–2021 || 18 Jan 2021 || 108 || align=left | Disc.: SpacewatchAlt.: 2015 PZ255 || 
|- id="1998 BK48" bgcolor=#d6d6d6
| 0 ||  = (619167) || MBA-O || 16.5 || 2.8 km || multiple || 1998–2020 || 16 Apr 2020 || 89 || align=left | Disc.: Spacewatch || 
|- id="1998 BM50" bgcolor=#fefefe
| 0 ||  || MBA-I || 18.1 || data-sort-value="0.71" | 710 m || multiple || 1998–2020 || 20 Oct 2020 || 115 || align=left | Disc.: Spacewatch || 
|- id="1998 BN50" bgcolor=#fefefe
| 0 ||  || MBA-I || 17.63 || data-sort-value="0.89" | 890 m || multiple || 1998–2021 || 06 Nov 2021 || 126 || align=left | Disc.: ODAS || 
|}
back to top

D 

|- id="1998 DU8" bgcolor=#E9E9E9
| 0 ||  || MBA-M || 17.2 || 1.5 km || multiple || 1998–2020 || 24 Mar 2020 || 122 || align=left | Disc.: SpacewatchAlt.: 2011 CO22, 2013 TN147 || 
|- id="1998 DO11" bgcolor=#d6d6d6
| 0 ||  || MBA-O || 16.6 || 2.7 km || multiple || 1998–2021 || 10 Jun 2021 || 203 || align=left | Disc.: NEAT/GEODSSAlt.: 2014 YJ47 || 
|- id="1998 DX11" bgcolor=#FFC2E0
| 6 ||  || APO || 27.0 || data-sort-value="0.014" | 14 m || single || 3 days || 26 Feb 1998 || 13 || align=left | Disc.: Spacewatch || 
|- id="1998 DW18" bgcolor=#fefefe
| 0 ||  || MBA-I || 18.6 || data-sort-value="0.57" | 570 m || multiple || 1998–2020 || 08 Nov 2020 || 117 || align=left | Disc.: SpacewatchAlt.: 2003 UE404, 2010 WM13 || 
|- id="1998 DV20" bgcolor=#FFC2E0
| 8 ||  || APO || 20.3 || data-sort-value="0.31" | 310 m || single || 10 days || 06 Mar 1998 || 11 || align=left | Disc.: Spacewatch || 
|- id="1998 DH22" bgcolor=#fefefe
| 0 ||  || MBA-I || 19.9 || data-sort-value="0.31" | 310 m || multiple || 1998–2021 || 17 Feb 2021 || 141 || align=left | Disc.: SpacewatchAdded on 17 June 2021Alt.: 2011 BR143 || 
|- id="1998 DR22" bgcolor=#E9E9E9
| 0 ||  || MBA-M || 17.49 || 1.8 km || multiple || 1998–2021 || 07 Apr 2021 || 256 || align=left | Disc.: Spacewatch || 
|- id="1998 DR24" bgcolor=#fefefe
| 0 ||  || MBA-I || 18.17 || data-sort-value="0.69" | 690 m || multiple || 1998–2021 || 17 Jun 2021 || 85 || align=left | Disc.: SpacewatchAlt.: 2015 XD270 || 
|- id="1998 DA25" bgcolor=#d6d6d6
| 0 ||  || MBA-O || 16.97 || 2.2 km || multiple || 1998–2021 || 08 Sep 2021 || 79 || align=left | Disc.: SpacewatchAdded on 22 July 2020Alt.: 2020 HF22 || 
|- id="1998 DH25" bgcolor=#fefefe
| 0 ||  || MBA-I || 18.8 || data-sort-value="0.52" | 520 m || multiple || 1998–2021 || 08 Jun 2021 || 63 || align=left | Disc.: Spacewatch || 
|- id="1998 DL25" bgcolor=#d6d6d6
| 0 ||  || MBA-O || 17.39 || 1.9 km || multiple || 1998–2021 || 30 Nov 2021 || 87 || align=left | Disc.: Spacewatch || 
|- id="1998 DM25" bgcolor=#fefefe
| 0 ||  || MBA-I || 18.9 || data-sort-value="0.49" | 490 m || multiple || 1998–2021 || 10 Apr 2021 || 35 || align=left | —Added on 29 January 2022 || 
|- id="1998 DF26" bgcolor=#fefefe
| 0 ||  || MBA-I || 18.96 || data-sort-value="0.48" | 480 m || multiple || 1998–2021 || 08 May 2021 || 43 || align=left | Disc.: Spacewatch || 
|- id="1998 DB27" bgcolor=#d6d6d6
| 0 ||  || MBA-O || 16.3 || 3.1 km || multiple || 1998–2020 || 19 Apr 2020 || 83 || align=left | Disc.: SpacewatchAlt.: 2012 UU32, 2015 FM104 || 
|- id="1998 DY27" bgcolor=#E9E9E9
| 0 ||  || MBA-M || 17.23 || 2.0 km || multiple || 1998–2021 || 15 Apr 2021 || 127 || align=left | Disc.: SpacewatchAlt.: 2014 SE6 || 
|- id="1998 DK36" bgcolor=#FFC2E0
| 7 ||  || ATI || 25.0 || data-sort-value="0.036" | 36 m || single || 1 day || 24 Feb 1998 || 4 || align=left | Disc.: Mauna Kea Obs. || 
|- id="1998 DV38" bgcolor=#E9E9E9
| 0 ||  || MBA-M || 17.9 || 1.5 km || multiple || 1998–2017 || 01 Jul 2017 || 39 || align=left | Disc.: Spacewatch || 
|- id="1998 DX38" bgcolor=#fefefe
| 0 ||  || MBA-I || 18.8 || data-sort-value="0.52" | 520 m || multiple || 1998–2020 || 17 Dec 2020 || 47 || align=left | Disc.: Spacewatch || 
|}
back to top

E 

|- id="1998 EE3" bgcolor=#FFC2E0
| 3 ||  || APO || 27.2 || data-sort-value="0.013" | 13 m || single || 3 days || 04 Mar 1998 || 11 || align=left | Disc.: Spacewatch || 
|- id="1998 EO3" bgcolor=#fefefe
| 1 ||  || MBA-I || 18.7 || data-sort-value="0.54" | 540 m || multiple || 1998–2020 || 15 May 2020 || 35 || align=left | Disc.: SpacewatchAdded on 19 October 2020 || 
|- id="1998 EX3" bgcolor=#FA8072
| 1 ||  || HUN || 18.8 || data-sort-value="0.52" | 520 m || multiple || 1998–2020 || 19 Jan 2020 || 66 || align=left | Disc.: SpacewatchAlt.: 2008 BA33 || 
|- id="1998 EP4" bgcolor=#FFC2E0
| 2 ||  || APO || 21.5 || data-sort-value="0.18" | 180 m || multiple || 1996–1998 || 05 Apr 1998 || 71 || align=left | Disc.: Spacewatch || 
|- id="1998 EK22" bgcolor=#d6d6d6
| 0 ||  || MBA-O || 16.94 || 2.3 km || multiple || 1998–2021 || 03 May 2021 || 93 || align=left | Disc.: SpacewatchAlt.: 2015 BU119 || 
|- id="1998 EU22" bgcolor=#fefefe
| 0 ||  || MBA-I || 18.24 || data-sort-value="0.67" | 670 m || multiple || 1998–2021 || 29 Oct 2021 || 88 || align=left | Disc.: Spacewatch || 
|}
back to top

F 

|- id="1998 FL5" bgcolor=#FFC2E0
| 0 ||  || APO || 21.52 || data-sort-value="0.17" | 170 m || multiple || 1998–2022 || 19 Oct 2022 || 114 || align=left | Disc.: LINEAR || 
|- id="1998 FM9" bgcolor=#FFC2E0
| 0 ||  || AMO || 19.70 || data-sort-value="0.41" | 410 m || multiple || 1998–2022 || 22 Jan 2022 || 121 || align=left | Disc.: LINEAR || 
|- id="1998 FS11" bgcolor=#FA8072
| 2 ||  || MCA || 19.4 || data-sort-value="0.39" | 390 m || multiple || 1998–2005 || 09 Mar 2005 || 82 || align=left | Disc.: NEAT/GEODSS || 
|- id="1998 FG12" bgcolor=#FFC2E0
| 6 ||  || APO || 21.0 || data-sort-value="0.22" | 220 m || single || 39 days || 02 May 1998 || 42 || align=left | Disc.: LINEAR || 
|- id="1998 FJ74" bgcolor=#FFC2E0
| 1 ||  || AMO || 18.8 || data-sort-value="0.62" | 620 m || multiple || 1998–2019 || 29 Nov 2019 || 157 || align=left | Disc.: LINEARAlt.: 2008 UD7 || 
|- id="1998 FS144" bgcolor=#C2E0FF
| 4 ||  || TNO || 6.7 || 235 km || multiple || 1998–2022 || 26 Apr 2022 || 22 || align=left | Disc.: Cerro TololoLoUTNOs, cubewano (hot), BR-mag: 1.53; taxonomy: IR || 
|- id="1998 FT149" bgcolor=#d6d6d6
| 0 ||  || MBA-O || 16.7 || 2.5 km || multiple || 1998–2020 || 02 May 2020 || 76 || align=left | Disc.: Spacewatch || 
|- id="1998 FU149" bgcolor=#d6d6d6
| 0 ||  || MBA-O || 16.82 || 2.4 km || multiple || 1998–2021 || 17 Jun 2021 || 75 || align=left | Disc.: Spacewatch || 
|}
back to top

G 

|- id="1998 GO" bgcolor=#fefefe
| 0 || 1998 GO || MBA-I || 18.5 || data-sort-value="0.59" | 590 m || multiple || 1998–2020 || 04 Jan 2020 || 53 || align=left | Disc.: SpacewatchAlt.: 2013 EQ27, 2013 EO179 || 
|- id="1998 GC1" bgcolor=#FFC2E0
| 2 ||  || AMO || 20.9 || data-sort-value="0.23" | 230 m || multiple || 1998–2017 || 13 Mar 2017 || 94 || align=left | Disc.: LINEAR || 
|- id="1998 GL10" bgcolor=#FFC2E0
| 0 ||  || AMO || 19.0 || data-sort-value="0.56" | 560 m || multiple || 1998–2015 || 21 May 2015 || 286 || align=left | Disc.: LINEARAlt.: 2014 UW34 || 
|- id="1998 GM10" bgcolor=#FA8072
| 1 ||  || MCA || 19.3 || data-sort-value="0.41" | 410 m || multiple || 1998–2021 || 19 Jun 2021 || 84 || align=left | Disc.: LINEARAlt.: 2021 ES4 || 
|- id="1998 GF13" bgcolor=#fefefe
| 0 ||  || MBA-I || 17.98 || data-sort-value="0.75" | 750 m || multiple || 1998–2022 || 25 Jan 2022 || 127 || align=left | Disc.: Spacewatch || 
|}
back to top

H 

|- id="1998 HH1" bgcolor=#FFC2E0
| 4 ||  || AMO || 23.2 || data-sort-value="0.081" | 81 m || single || 32 days || 19 May 1998 || 40 || align=left | Disc.: Spacewatch || 
|- id="1998 HM1" bgcolor=#FFC2E0
| 3 ||  || APO || 24.4 || data-sort-value="0.047" | 47 m || single || 7 days || 25 Apr 1998 || 33 || align=left | Disc.: Spacewatch || 
|- id="1998 HN3" bgcolor=#FFC2E0
| 0 ||  || AMO || 18.2 || data-sort-value="0.81" | 810 m || multiple || 1998–2020 || 17 Jun 2020 || 118 || align=left | Disc.: SpacewatchNEO larger than 1 kilometer || 
|- id="1998 HO4" bgcolor=#E9E9E9
| 0 ||  || MBA-M || 17.2 || 1.1 km || multiple || 1998–2020 || 15 Oct 2020 || 123 || align=left | Disc.: Kleť Obs.Alt.: 2010 HN13, 2015 NX29 || 
|- id="1998 HK5" bgcolor=#E9E9E9
| 0 ||  || MBA-M || 17.9 || 1.1 km || multiple || 1998–2020 || 23 Jun 2020 || 67 || align=left | Disc.: SpacewatchAdded on 22 July 2020 || 
|- id="1998 HZ7" bgcolor=#d6d6d6
| 2 ||  || MBA-O || 17.2 || 2.0 km || multiple || 1998–2004 || 18 Jul 2004 || 102 || align=left | Disc.: Kleť Obs. || 
|- id="1998 HJ11" bgcolor=#fefefe
| 0 ||  || MBA-I || 18.03 || data-sort-value="0.74" | 740 m || multiple || 1998–2021 || 27 Oct 2021 || 91 || align=left | Disc.: SpacewatchAdded on 13 September 2020 || 
|- id="1998 HE15" bgcolor=#fefefe
| 0 ||  || MBA-I || 18.19 || data-sort-value="0.68" | 680 m || multiple || 1998–2021 || 17 Aug 2021 || 38 || align=left | Disc.: SpacewatchAdded on 22 July 2020 || 
|- id="1998 HQ15" bgcolor=#d6d6d6
| 0 ||  = (619168) || MBA-O || 15.9 || 3.7 km || multiple || 1998–2020 || 23 Jun 2020 || 138 || align=left | Disc.: Spacewatch || 
|- id="1998 HX15" bgcolor=#fefefe
| 0 ||  || MBA-I || 17.5 || data-sort-value="0.94" | 940 m || multiple || 1998–2019 || 25 Oct 2019 || 73 || align=left | Disc.: SpacewatchAdded on 22 July 2020Alt.: 2002 JV148, 2010 EM148 || 
|- id="1998 HE16" bgcolor=#E9E9E9
| 0 ||  || MBA-M || 17.45 || 1.4 km || multiple || 1998–2021 || 13 Sep 2021 || 95 || align=left | Disc.: Spacewatch || 
|- id="1998 HH24" bgcolor=#d6d6d6
| 0 ||  || MBA-O || 16.73 || data-sort-value="0.000000000000000056" | 2.6 km || multiple || 1998-2022 || 05 Jun 2022 || 73 || align=left | Disc.: Mauna Kea Obs.Added on 21 August 2021Alt.: 2010 DB106 = 2014 BX83|| 
|- id="1998 HB25" bgcolor=#fefefe
| 0 ||  || MBA-I || 17.78 || data-sort-value="0.83" | 830 m || multiple || 1998–2021 || 14 Apr 2021 || 102 || align=left | Disc.: SpacewatchAlt.: 2002 JH3, 2017 BY104 || 
|- id="1998 HX27" bgcolor=#d6d6d6
| 0 ||  || MBA-O || 16.52 || 2.8 km || multiple || 1998–2021 || 11 Jul 2021 || 77 || align=left | Disc.: SpacewatchAdded on 22 July 2020Alt.: 2009 DO34, 2010 GM87 || 
|- id="1998 HT31" bgcolor=#FFC2E0
| 2 ||  || APO || 20.8 || data-sort-value="0.25" | 250 m || single || 19 days || 09 May 1998 || 133 || align=left | Disc.: NEAT/GEODSSPotentially hazardous object || 
|- id="1998 HD43" bgcolor=#fefefe
| 2 ||  || MBA-I || 19.1 || data-sort-value="0.45" | 450 m || multiple || 1998–2021 || 10 Apr 2021 || 34 || align=left | Disc.: SpacewatchAdded on 24 December 2021 || 
|- id="1998 HH49" bgcolor=#FFC2E0
| 0 ||  || APO || 21.33 || data-sort-value="0.19" | 190 m || multiple || 1998–2021 || 01 Dec 2021 || 20 || align=left | Disc.: SpacewatchPotentially hazardous object || 
|- id="1998 HP126" bgcolor=#FFC2E0
| 9 ||  || ATE || 25.77 || data-sort-value="0.025" | 25 m || single || 1 day || 25 Apr 1998 || 15 || align=left | Disc.: LINEARAdded on 21 August 2021 || 
|- id="1998 HH151" bgcolor=#C2E0FF
| 1 ||  || TNO || 8.4 || 99 km || multiple || 1998–2013 || 14 May 2013 || 31 || align=left | Disc.: Mauna Kea Obs.LoUTNOs, plutino || 
|- id="1998 HL151" bgcolor=#C2E0FF
| 3 ||  || TNO || 8.1 || 100 km || multiple || 1998–2013 || 08 May 2013 || 25 || align=left | Disc.: Mauna Kea Obs.LoUTNOs, other TNO, BR-mag: 1.06 || 
|- id="1998 HN151" bgcolor=#C2E0FF
| 2 ||  || TNO || 8.3 || 91 km || multiple || 1998–2017 || 01 Apr 2017 || 31 || align=left | Disc.: Mauna Kea Obs.LoUTNOs, other TNO || 
|- id="1998 HO151" bgcolor=#C2E0FF
| 3 ||  || TNO || 8.2 || 95 km || multiple || 1998–2017 || 30 Mar 2017 || 19 || align=left | Disc.: Mauna Kea Obs.LoUTNOs, other TNO || 
|- id="1998 HR151" bgcolor=#C2E0FF
| E ||  || TNO || 8.6 || 65 km || single || 63 days || 30 Jun 1998 || 11 || align=left | Disc.: Mauna Kea Obs.LoUTNOs, cubewano? || 
|- id="1998 HE159" bgcolor=#E9E9E9
| 0 ||  || MBA-M || 17.1 || 1.6 km || multiple || 1998–2019 || 21 Apr 2019 || 123 || align=left | Disc.: Spacewatch || 
|- id="1998 HF159" bgcolor=#fefefe
| 0 ||  || MBA-I || 18.6 || data-sort-value="0.57" | 570 m || multiple || 1998–2019 || 24 Sep 2019 || 61 || align=left | Disc.: Spacewatch || 
|- id="1998 HG159" bgcolor=#E9E9E9
| 0 ||  || MBA-M || 17.48 || 1.8 km || multiple || 1998–2020 || 24 Mar 2020 || 53 || align=left | Disc.: Spacewatch || 
|- id="1998 HH159" bgcolor=#E9E9E9
| 0 ||  || MBA-M || 17.57 || 1.3 km || multiple || 1998–2021 || 04 Oct 2021 || 107 || align=left | Disc.: Spacewatch || 
|- id="1998 HJ159" bgcolor=#fefefe
| 0 ||  || MBA-I || 18.25 || data-sort-value="0.67" | 670 m || multiple || 1998–2021 || 02 Oct 2021 || 83 || align=left | Disc.: DB MissingAdded on 19 October 2020 || 
|}
back to top

J 

|- id="1998 JG2" bgcolor=#FA8072
| 0 ||  || MCA || 18.9 || data-sort-value="0.49" | 490 m || multiple || 1998–2020 || 23 Jun 2020 || 104 || align=left | Disc.: Whipple Obs. || 
|}
back to top

K 

|- id="1998 KH" bgcolor=#FFC2E0
| 4 || 1998 KH || APO || 19.2 || data-sort-value="0.51" | 510 m || multiple || 1998–2015 || 01 Jun 2015 || 133 || align=left | Disc.: LINEAR || 
|- id="1998 KD3" bgcolor=#FFC2E0
| 4 ||  || APO || 20.6 || data-sort-value="0.27" | 270 m || single || 28 days || 21 Jun 1998 || 172 || align=left | Disc.: LINEARAMO at MPC || 
|- id="1998 KF3" bgcolor=#FFC2E0
| 1 ||  || AMO || 18.9 || data-sort-value="0.59" | 590 m || multiple || 1998–2017 || 20 Jul 2017 || 83 || align=left | Disc.: LINEAR || 
|- id="1998 KO3" bgcolor=#FFC2E0
| 8 ||  || APO || 19.5 || data-sort-value="0.45" | 450 m || single || 6 days || 30 May 1998 || 60 || align=left | Disc.: LINEAR || 
|- id="1998 KF6" bgcolor=#FA8072
| 2 ||  || MCA || 20.3 || data-sort-value="0.26" | 260 m || multiple || 1998–2019 || 08 May 2019 || 70 || align=left | Disc.: LINEARAlt.: 2013 JT6 || 
|- id="1998 KD11" bgcolor=#E9E9E9
| 0 ||  || MBA-M || 17.5 || data-sort-value="0.94" | 940 m || multiple || 1998–2019 || 31 Oct 2019 || 79 || align=left | Disc.: SpacewatchAlt.: 2019 SA32 || 
|- id="1998 KF11" bgcolor=#E9E9E9
| 0 ||  || MBA-M || 18.62 || 1.1 km || multiple || 1998–2021 || 28 Sep 2021 || 61 || align=left | Disc.: Spacewatch || 
|- id="1998 KK16" bgcolor=#FA8072
| 1 ||  || MCA || 17.5 || 1.8 km || multiple || 1998–2020 || 23 Dec 2020 || 123 || align=left | Disc.: LINEAR || 
|- id="1998 KC17" bgcolor=#E9E9E9
| 0 ||  || MBA-M || 17.8 || data-sort-value="0.82" | 820 m || multiple || 1998–2020 || 17 Dec 2020 || 78 || align=left | Disc.: SpacewatchAlt.: 2014 HG123 || 
|- id="1998 KJ17" bgcolor=#FFC2E0
| 6 ||  || AMO || 23.5 || data-sort-value="0.071" | 71 m || single || 8 days || 05 Jun 1998 || 59 || align=left | Disc.: LINEAR || 
|- id="1998 KY26" bgcolor=#FFC2E0
| 0 ||  || APO || 25.60 || data-sort-value="0.027" | 27 m || multiple || 1998–2020 || 15 Dec 2020 || 285 || align=left | Disc.: Spacewatch || 
|- id="1998 KH42" bgcolor=#E9E9E9
| 0 ||  || MBA-M || 17.67 || 1.2 km || multiple || 1998–2021 || 13 Sep 2021 || 208 || align=left | Disc.: SpacewatchAdded on 22 July 2020 || 
|- id="1998 KV42" bgcolor=#E9E9E9
| 0 ||  || MBA-M || 16.7 || 1.4 km || multiple || 1991–2021 || 11 Jan 2021 || 122 || align=left | Disc.: Spacewatch || 
|- id="1998 KX42" bgcolor=#E9E9E9
| 0 ||  || MBA-M || 16.8 || 2.4 km || multiple || 1998–2020 || 31 Jan 2020 || 57 || align=left | Disc.: Spacewatch || 
|- id="1998 KC43" bgcolor=#d6d6d6
| 0 ||  || MBA-O || 15.71 || 4.0 km || multiple || 1998–2022 || 08 Jan 2022 || 156 || align=left | Disc.: SpacewatchAlt.: 2010 LU125, 2018 PK2 || 
|- id="1998 KY61" bgcolor=#C2E0FF
| 2 ||  || TNO || 7.3 || 115 km || multiple || 1998–2017 || 22 Aug 2017 || 58 || align=left | Disc.: Cerro TololoLoUTNOs, cubewano (cold) || 
|- id="1998 KS65" bgcolor=#C2E0FF
| 4 ||  || TNO || 7.65 || 98 km || multiple || 1998–2021 || 12 Sep 2021 || 57 || align=left | Disc.: Cerro TololoLoUTNOs, cubewano (cold), BR-mag: 1.73; taxonomy: RR-IR || 
|- id="1998 KD66" bgcolor=#C2E0FF
| E ||  || TNO || 8.9 || 57 km || single || 10 days || 30 May 1998 || 3 || align=left | Disc.: Cerro TololoLoUTNOs, cubewano? || 
|- id="1998 KE66" bgcolor=#C2E0FF
| E ||  || TNO || 9.0 || 54 km || single || 10 days || 30 May 1998 || 3 || align=left | Disc.: Cerro TololoLoUTNOs, cubewano? || 
|- id="1998 KF66" bgcolor=#C2E0FF
| E ||  || TNO || 9.8 || 52 km || single || 10 days || 30 May 1998 || 3 || align=left | Disc.: Cerro TololoLoUTNOs, plutino? || 
|- id="1998 KG66" bgcolor=#C2E0FF
| E ||  || TNO || 8.9 || 57 km || single || 10 days || 30 May 1998 || 3 || align=left | Disc.: Cerro TololoLoUTNOs, cubewano? || 
|- id="1998 KF69" bgcolor=#d6d6d6
| 0 ||  || MBA-O || 16.30 || 3.1 km || multiple || 1998–2021 || 03 Aug 2021 || 129 || align=left | Disc.: Spacewatch || 
|- id="1998 KG69" bgcolor=#E9E9E9
| 0 ||  || MBA-M || 17.45 || 1.8 km || multiple || 1998–2021 || 30 Jul 2021 || 96 || align=left | Disc.: Spacewatch || 
|- id="1998 KH69" bgcolor=#fefefe
| 0 ||  || MBA-I || 18.2 || data-sort-value="0.68" | 680 m || multiple || 1998–2020 || 16 Oct 2020 || 39 || align=left | Disc.: Spacewatch || 
|}
back to top

L 

|- id="1998 LE" bgcolor=#FFC2E0
| 6 || 1998 LE || APO || 20.38 || data-sort-value="0.30" | 300 m || multiple || 1998–2021 || 26 Jan 2021 || 93 || align=left | Disc.: LINEAR || 
|}
back to top

M 

|- id="1998 MN" bgcolor=#fefefe
| 0 || 1998 MN || MBA-I || 17.44 || data-sort-value="0.97" | 970 m || multiple || 1998–2022 || 10 Jan 2022 || 108 || align=left | Disc.: SpacewatchAlt.: 2016 NF18 || 
|- id="1998 MR" bgcolor=#fefefe
| 0 || 1998 MR || MBA-I || 17.7 || data-sort-value="0.86" | 860 m || multiple || 1998–2021 || 18 Jan 2021 || 91 || align=left | Disc.: Spacewatch || 
|- id="1998 MS" bgcolor=#fefefe
| 0 || 1998 MS || HUN || 18.39 || data-sort-value="0.62" | 620 m || multiple || 1998–2022 || 25 Jan 2022 || 62 || align=left | Disc.: SpacewatchAdded on 24 December 2021 || 
|- id="1998 MS2" bgcolor=#FFC2E0
| 2 ||  || AMO || 20.4 || data-sort-value="0.30" | 300 m || multiple || 1998–2014 || 25 Jun 2014 || 123 || align=left | Disc.: CSS || 
|- id="1998 MQ4" bgcolor=#E9E9E9
| 0 ||  || MBA-M || 17.95 || data-sort-value="0.76" | 760 m || multiple || 1998–2019 || 27 Nov 2019 || 154 || align=left | Disc.: SpacewatchAlt.: 2011 UK386 || 
|- id="1998 ML5" bgcolor=#d6d6d6
| 0 ||  || MBA-O || 16.16 || 3.3 km || multiple || 1998–2021 || 29 Oct 2021 || 183 || align=left | Disc.: SpacewatchAlt.: 2008 AP99, 2010 OM || 
|- id="1998 MV5" bgcolor=#FFC2E0
| 7 ||  || APO || 24.0 || data-sort-value="0.056" | 56 m || single || 9 days || 02 Jul 1998 || 27 || align=left | Disc.: LINEAR || 
|- id="1998 MM14" bgcolor=#FA8072
| 0 ||  || MCA || 18.66 || data-sort-value="0.55" | 550 m || multiple || 1998–2021 || 31 Oct 2021 || 84 || align=left | Disc.: LINEAR || 
|- id="1998 ME23" bgcolor=#d6d6d6
| 0 ||  || MBA-O || 16.89 || 2.3 km || multiple || 1998–2020 || 08 Oct 2020 || 105 || align=left | Disc.: Spacewatch || 
|- id="1998 MR24" bgcolor=#FFC2E0
| 1 ||  || AMO || 19.2 || data-sort-value="0.51" | 510 m || multiple || 1987–2020 || 11 Dec 2020 || 244 || align=left | Disc.: Siding SpringAlt.: 1987 KU2 || 
|- id="1998 MV49" bgcolor=#fefefe
| 0 ||  || MBA-I || 17.87 || data-sort-value="0.79" | 790 m || multiple || 1998–2021 || 27 Nov 2021 || 130 || align=left | Disc.: Spacewatch || 
|}
back to top

O 

|- id="1998 OL4" bgcolor=#E9E9E9
| 0 ||  || MBA-M || 17.47 || 1.8 km || multiple || 1998–2021 || 08 Dec 2021 || 64 || align=left | Disc.: SpacewatchAdded on 30 September 2021Alt.: 2021 QV || 
|- id="1998 OM4" bgcolor=#FA8072
| 0 ||  || MCA || 18.23 || data-sort-value="0.67" | 670 m || multiple || 1995–2019 || 10 Jul 2019 || 45 || align=left | Disc.: SpacewatchAdded on 17 June 2021Alt.: 2005 NK31 || 
|- id="1998 OO4" bgcolor=#fefefe
| 0 ||  || MBA-I || 18.4 || data-sort-value="0.62" | 620 m || multiple || 1998–2020 || 24 Jun 2020 || 73 || align=left | Disc.: SpacewatchAlt.: 2016 GK179 || 
|- id="1998 OP4" bgcolor=#FFC2E0
| 7 ||  || AMO || 24.0 || data-sort-value="0.056" | 56 m || single || 4 days || 31 Jul 1998 || 21 || align=left | Disc.: Spacewatch || 
|- id="1998 OS4" bgcolor=#FA8072
| 1 ||  || MCA || 18.3 || 1.2 km || multiple || 1998–2020 || 26 May 2020 || 170 || align=left | Disc.: LONEOS || 
|- id="1998 OS15" bgcolor=#E9E9E9
| 0 ||  || MBA-M || 17.0 || 1.7 km || multiple || 1998–2020 || 11 Oct 2020 || 162 || align=left | Disc.: SpacewatchAlt.: 2010 LX73 || 
|- id="1998 OU15" bgcolor=#d6d6d6
| 0 ||  || MBA-O || 16.4 || 2.9 km || multiple || 1998–2020 || 21 Oct 2020 || 57 || align=left | Disc.: Spacewatch || 
|}
back to top

Q 

|- id="1998 QQ" bgcolor=#FFC2E0
| 3 || 1998 QQ || APO || 18.7 || data-sort-value="0.65" | 650 m || multiple || 1998–2019 || 18 Oct 2019 || 172 || align=left | Disc.: LINEARAlt.: 2015 TV350 || 
|- id="1998 QE1" bgcolor=#E9E9E9
| 2 ||  || MBA-M || 17.7 || data-sort-value="0.86" | 860 m || multiple || 1998–2020 || 01 Feb 2020 || 79 || align=left | Disc.: LINEARAlt.: 2002 PF87 || 
|- id="1998 QF1" bgcolor=#FA8072
| 0 ||  || MCA || 18.82 || data-sort-value="0.51" | 510 m || multiple || 1998–2022 || 06 Jan 2022 || 111 || align=left | Disc.: LINEAR || 
|- id="1998 QH1" bgcolor=#FFC2E0
| 1 ||  || AMO || 20.7 || data-sort-value="0.26" | 260 m || multiple || 1998–2002 || 14 Sep 2002 || 47 || align=left | Disc.: LINEAR || 
|- id="1998 QJ1" bgcolor=#C7FF8F
| 3 ||  || CEN || 16.5 || 2.9 km || single || 62 days || 18 Oct 1998 || 51 || align=left | Disc.: LINEAR || 
|- id="1998 QD2" bgcolor=#d6d6d6
| 1 ||  || MBA-O || 17.0 || 2.2 km || multiple || 1982–2021 || 06 Jan 2021 || 132 || align=left | Disc.: LINEAR || 
|- id="1998 QE3" bgcolor=#FA8072
| 0 ||  || MCA || 18.34 || data-sort-value="0.64" | 640 m || multiple || 1998–2021 || 29 Nov 2021 || 53 || align=left | Disc.: LINEAR || 
|- id="1998 QV3" bgcolor=#FFC2E0
| 5 ||  || AMO || 20.5 || data-sort-value="0.28" | 280 m || single || 58 days || 13 Oct 1998 || 63 || align=left | Disc.: LINEAR || 
|- id="1998 QV27" bgcolor=#FA8072
| 0 ||  || MCA || 18.8 || data-sort-value="0.52" | 520 m || multiple || 1998–2017 || 19 Oct 2017 || 58 || align=left | Disc.: Spacewatch || 
|- id="1998 QW27" bgcolor=#fefefe
| 1 ||  || HUN || 18.5 || data-sort-value="0.59" | 590 m || multiple || 1998–2019 || 25 Nov 2019 || 52 || align=left | Disc.: SpacewatchAdded on 22 July 2020Alt.: 2019 WL || 
|- id="1998 QF28" bgcolor=#E9E9E9
| 0 ||  || MBA-M || 17.64 || 1.7 km || multiple || 1998–2021 || 29 Aug 2021 || 69 || align=left | Disc.: SpacewatchAlt.: 2012 RC7 || 
|- id="1998 QH28" bgcolor=#FFC2E0
| 8 ||  || AMO || 22.9 || data-sort-value="0.093" | 93 m || single || 7 days || 30 Aug 1998 || 15 || align=left | Disc.: Spacewatch || 
|- id="1998 QK28" bgcolor=#FFC2E0
| 1 ||  || APO || 19.2 || data-sort-value="0.51" | 510 m || multiple || 1998–2017 || 31 Jan 2017 || 144 || align=left | Disc.: LINEARPotentially hazardous object || 
|- id="1998 QP52" bgcolor=#FA8072
| 0 ||  || MCA || 18.08 || 1.3 km || multiple || 1998–2022 || 09 Jan 2022 || 103 || align=left | Disc.: LINEAR || 
|- id="1998 QQ52" bgcolor=#FFC2E0
| 0 ||  || AMO || 21.14 || data-sort-value="0.21" | 210 m || multiple || 1998–2010 || 15 Jul 2010 || 65 || align=left | Disc.: LINEAR || 
|- id="1998 QJ56" bgcolor=#FA8072
| 1 ||  || MCA || 18.0 || 1.1 km || multiple || 1998–2021 || 14 Jan 2021 || 117 || align=left | Disc.: LINEAR || 
|- id="1998 QN56" bgcolor=#fefefe
| 0 ||  || MBA-I || 18.39 || data-sort-value="0.62" | 620 m || multiple || 1998–2021 || 05 Nov 2021 || 126 || align=left | Disc.: Spacewatch || 
|- id="1998 QX56" bgcolor=#fefefe
| 3 ||  || MBA-I || 18.8 || data-sort-value="0.52" | 520 m || multiple || 1998–2019 || 03 Oct 2019 || 42 || align=left | Disc.: Spacewatch || 
|- id="1998 QR57" bgcolor=#fefefe
| – ||  || MBA-I || 19.2 || data-sort-value="0.43" | 430 m || single || 20 days || 19 Sep 1998 || 8 || align=left | Disc.: Spacewatch || 
|- id="1998 QH59" bgcolor=#d6d6d6
| 0 ||  || MBA-O || 16.57 || 2.7 km || multiple || 1998–2021 || 07 Oct 2021 || 96 || align=left | Disc.: SpacewatchAlt.: 2019 FL12 || 
|- id="1998 QO59" bgcolor=#fefefe
| 2 ||  || MBA-I || 19.4 || data-sort-value="0.39" | 390 m || multiple || 1998–2018 || 08 Aug 2018 || 22 || align=left | Disc.: Spacewatch || 
|- id="1998 QU59" bgcolor=#E9E9E9
| 0 ||  || MBA-M || 17.90 || 1.1 km || multiple || 1998–2022 || 26 Jan 2022 || 67 || align=left | Disc.: SpacewatchAlt.: 2017 BM4 || 
|- id="1998 QA62" bgcolor=#FFC2E0
| 0 ||  || APO || 19.29 || data-sort-value="0.56" | 500 m || multiple || 1998-2022 || 12 Apr 2022 || 80 || align=left | Disc.: LINEARPotentially hazardous object || 
|- id="1998 QP63" bgcolor=#FA8072
| 1 ||  || MCA || 18.0 || 1.1 km || multiple || 1976–2021 || 11 Jan 2021 || 207 || align=left | Disc.: LINEAR || 
|- id="1998 QQ85" bgcolor=#FA8072
| 1 ||  || MCA || 18.05 || 1.4 km || multiple || 1998–2021 || 29 Nov 2021 || 69 || align=left | Disc.: LINEARAlt.: 2007 PN4 || 
|- id="1998 QX104" bgcolor=#FA8072
| 2 ||  || MCA || 19.6 || data-sort-value="0.36" | 360 m || multiple || 1995–2020 || 23 Oct 2020 || 24 || align=left | Disc.: ODAS || 
|- id="1998 QA105" bgcolor=#FFC2E0
| 5 ||  || AMO || 21.5 || data-sort-value="0.18" | 180 m || single || 58 days || 27 Oct 1998 || 24 || align=left | Disc.: Spacewatch || 
|- id="1998 QA107" bgcolor=#FA8072
| 3 ||  || MCA || 20.2 || data-sort-value="0.27" | 270 m || multiple || 1998–2018 || 14 Sep 2018 || 41 || align=left | Disc.: SpacewatchAlt.: 2008 RZ75 || 
|- id="1998 QQ110" bgcolor=#E9E9E9
| 1 ||  || MBA-M || 17.9 || 1.1 km || multiple || 1998–2015 || 10 Oct 2015 || 44 || align=left | Disc.: SpacewatchAlt.: 2015 TA182 || 
|- id="1998 QA112" bgcolor=#fefefe
| 0 ||  || MBA-I || 18.44 || data-sort-value="0.61" | 610 m || multiple || 1998–2021 || 05 Nov 2021 || 99 || align=left | Disc.: Spacewatch || 
|- id="1998 QB112" bgcolor=#fefefe
| 0 ||  || MBA-I || 18.4 || data-sort-value="0.62" | 620 m || multiple || 1998–2019 || 07 Jun 2019 || 59 || align=left | Disc.: Spacewatch || 
|- id="1998 QD112" bgcolor=#d6d6d6
| 0 ||  || MBA-O || 16.3 || 3.1 km || multiple || 1998–2021 || 03 Dec 2021 || 143 || align=left | Disc.: Spacewatch || 
|- id="1998 QE112" bgcolor=#d6d6d6
| 0 ||  || MBA-O || 17.2 || 2.0 km || multiple || 1998–2019 || 28 Dec 2019 || 55 || align=left | Disc.: Spacewatch || 
|- id="1998 QF112" bgcolor=#fefefe
| 0 ||  || MBA-I || 18.54 || data-sort-value="0.58" | 580 m || multiple || 1998–2021 || 27 Nov 2021 || 69 || align=left | Disc.: Spacewatch || 
|- id="1998 QJ112" bgcolor=#E9E9E9
| 0 ||  || MBA-M || 17.31 || 1.5 km || multiple || 1998–2022 || 24 Jan 2022 || 84 || align=left | Disc.: Spacewatch || 
|- id="1998 QK112" bgcolor=#E9E9E9
| 0 ||  || MBA-M || 17.96 || 1.4 km || multiple || 1998–2021 || 07 Nov 2021 || 93 || align=left | Disc.: Spacewatch || 
|- id="1998 QL112" bgcolor=#d6d6d6
| 0 ||  || MBA-O || 17.23 || 2.0 km || multiple || 1998–2021 || 25 Nov 2021 || 80 || align=left | Disc.: Spacewatch || 
|- id="1998 QM112" bgcolor=#d6d6d6
| 1 ||  || MBA-O || 17.8 || 1.5 km || multiple || 1998–2018 || 11 Aug 2018 || 33 || align=left | Disc.: Spacewatch || 
|- id="1998 QN112" bgcolor=#E9E9E9
| 0 ||  || MBA-M || 17.53 || 1.7 km || multiple || 1998–2021 || 02 Oct 2021 || 76 || align=left | Disc.: No observationsAdded on 22 July 2020 || 
|}
back to top

R 

|- id="1998 RC" bgcolor=#FA8072
| 2 || 1998 RC || MCA || 19.2 || data-sort-value="0.61" | 610 m || multiple || 1998–2020 || 26 Sep 2020 || 68 || align=left | Disc.: SpacewatchAdded on 9 March 2021Alt.: 2020 OO6 || 
|- id="1998 RR2" bgcolor=#FA8072
| 0 ||  || MCA || 17.4 || 1.4 km || multiple || 1998–2021 || 17 Jan 2021 || 244 || align=left | Disc.: LINEAR || 
|- id="1998 RC3" bgcolor=#fefefe
| 1 ||  || MBA-I || 18.9 || data-sort-value="0.49" | 490 m || multiple || 1998–2020 || 10 Dec 2020 || 61 || align=left | Disc.: SpacewatchAlt.: 2009 SU40 || 
|- id="1998 RJ8" bgcolor=#d6d6d6
| 0 ||  || MBA-O || 17.4 || 1.8 km || multiple || 1998–2019 || 25 Sep 2019 || 56 || align=left | Disc.: Spacewatch || 
|- id="1998 RS8" bgcolor=#E9E9E9
| 2 ||  || MBA-M || 18.3 || 1.2 km || multiple || 2007–2016 || 07 Nov 2016 || 30 || align=left | Disc.: Spacewatch || 
|- id="1998 RB10" bgcolor=#fefefe
| 1 ||  || MBA-I || 17.9 || data-sort-value="0.78" | 780 m || multiple || 1998–2017 || 13 Dec 2017 || 65 || align=left | Disc.: Spacewatch || 
|- id="1998 RK10" bgcolor=#fefefe
| 2 ||  || MBA-I || 18.7 || data-sort-value="0.54" | 540 m || multiple || 1998–2017 || 11 Dec 2017 || 48 || align=left | Disc.: Spacewatch || 
|- id="1998 RU10" bgcolor=#fefefe
| 0 ||  || MBA-I || 18.9 || data-sort-value="0.49" | 490 m || multiple || 1995–2020 || 16 Oct 2020 || 90 || align=left | Disc.: Spacewatch || 
|- id="1998 RZ10" bgcolor=#E9E9E9
| 0 ||  || MBA-M || 17.60 || 1.7 km || multiple || 1998–2021 || 30 Nov 2021 || 102 || align=left | Disc.: SpacewatchAdded on 22 July 2020 || 
|- id="1998 RJ11" bgcolor=#fefefe
| 1 ||  || MBA-I || 18.9 || data-sort-value="0.49" | 490 m || multiple || 1998–2016 || 10 Nov 2016 || 33 || align=left | Disc.: SpacewatchAlt.: 2016 TT88 || 
|- id="1998 RZ11" bgcolor=#fefefe
| 0 ||  || MBA-I || 18.65 || data-sort-value="0.55" | 550 m || multiple || 1998–2021 || 12 May 2021 || 41 || align=left | Disc.: Spacewatch || 
|- id="1998 RK12" bgcolor=#fefefe
| 0 ||  || MBA-I || 18.0 || data-sort-value="0.75" | 750 m || multiple || 1998–2021 || 15 Jan 2021 || 146 || align=left | Disc.: SpacewatchAlt.: 2010 AW120 || 
|- id="1998 RJ13" bgcolor=#fefefe
| 0 ||  || MBA-I || 18.7 || data-sort-value="0.54" | 540 m || multiple || 1998–2019 || 28 Nov 2019 || 81 || align=left | Disc.: Spacewatch || 
|- id="1998 RL13" bgcolor=#E9E9E9
| 0 ||  || MBA-M || 17.7 || 1.6 km || multiple || 1998–2017 || 25 Oct 2017 || 45 || align=left | Disc.: SpacewatchAlt.: 2003 UW394 || 
|- id="1998 RL14" bgcolor=#d6d6d6
| 0 ||  || MBA-O || 16.89 || 2.3 km || multiple || 1998–2021 || 27 Oct 2021 || 72 || align=left | Disc.: SpacewatchAdded on 17 June 2021 || 
|- id="1998 RO15" bgcolor=#d6d6d6
| 0 ||  || MBA-O || 16.79 || 2.4 km || multiple || 1998–2021 || 28 Nov 2021 || 101 || align=left | Disc.: SpacewatchAlt.: 2007 ES240 || 
|- id="1998 RY20" bgcolor=#E9E9E9
| 3 ||  || MBA-M || 17.9 || data-sort-value="0.78" | 780 m || multiple || 1998–2019 || 04 Nov 2019 || 29 || align=left | Disc.: SpacewatchAdded on 22 July 2020 || 
|- id="1998 RB21" bgcolor=#d6d6d6
| 0 ||  || MBA-O || 17.2 || 2.0 km || multiple || 1998–2020 || 21 Sep 2020 || 104 || align=left | Disc.: Spacewatch || 
|- id="1998 RL21" bgcolor=#E9E9E9
| 1 ||  || MBA-M || 18.6 || data-sort-value="0.57" | 570 m || multiple || 1998–2019 || 20 Dec 2019 || 58 || align=left | Disc.: Spacewatch || 
|- id="1998 RO21" bgcolor=#fefefe
| 0 ||  || MBA-I || 18.2 || data-sort-value="0.68" | 680 m || multiple || 1998–2020 || 08 Dec 2020 || 84 || align=left | Disc.: SpacewatchAlt.: 2007 ED58 || 
|- id="1998 RX21" bgcolor=#fefefe
| 0 ||  || MBA-I || 18.6 || data-sort-value="0.57" | 570 m || multiple || 1998–2020 || 10 Nov 2020 || 79 || align=left | Disc.: Spacewatch || 
|- id="1998 RA22" bgcolor=#fefefe
| 0 ||  || MBA-I || 19.1 || data-sort-value="0.45" | 450 m || multiple || 1998–2020 || 15 Oct 2020 || 61 || align=left | Disc.: Spacewatch || 
|- id="1998 RE43" bgcolor=#E9E9E9
| 2 ||  || MBA-M || 17.0 || 1.2 km || multiple || 1998–2019 || 03 Dec 2019 || 105 || align=left | Disc.: LINEARAlt.: 2002 PM85 || 
|- id="1998 RU48" bgcolor=#d6d6d6
| 0 ||  || MBA-O || 16.8 || 2.4 km || multiple || 1998–2020 || 17 Dec 2020 || 162 || align=left | Disc.: LINEARAlt.: 2014 QB309 || 
|- id="1998 RJ81" bgcolor=#fefefe
| 3 ||  || MBA-I || 19.63 || data-sort-value="0.35" | 350 m || multiple || 1998–2020 || 07 Dec 2020 || 21 || align=left | Disc.: SpacewatchAlt.: 2009 VG11 || 
|- id="1998 RL81" bgcolor=#fefefe
| 0 ||  || MBA-I || 18.5 || data-sort-value="0.62" | 580 m || multiple || 1998–2021 || 27 Oct 2021 || 94 || align=left | Disc.: Spacewatch Alt.: 2002 UJ73 || 
|- id="1998 RM81" bgcolor=#fefefe
| 0 ||  || MBA-I || 18.05 || data-sort-value="0.73" | 730 m || multiple || 1998–2022 || 25 Jan 2022 || 108 || align=left | Disc.: Spacewatch || 
|- id="1998 RN81" bgcolor=#E9E9E9
| 0 ||  || MBA-M || 18.0 || 1.1 km || multiple || 1998–2019 || 24 Dec 2019 || 49 || align=left | Disc.: Spacewatch || 
|- id="1998 RP81" bgcolor=#fefefe
| 0 ||  || MBA-I || 17.98 || data-sort-value="0.75" | 750 m || multiple || 1998–2022 || 26 Jan 2022 || 159 || align=left | Disc.: Spacewatch || 
|- id="1998 RQ81" bgcolor=#E9E9E9
| 0 ||  || MBA-M || 17.18 || 2.0 km || multiple || 1998–2021 || 05 Dec 2021 || 138 || align=left | Disc.: Spacewatch || 
|- id="1998 RR81" bgcolor=#d6d6d6
| 0 ||  || MBA-O || 16.34 || 3.0 km || multiple || 1998–2021 || 27 Nov 2021 || 158 || align=left | Disc.: Spacewatch || 
|- id="1998 RS81" bgcolor=#E9E9E9
| 1 ||  || MBA-M || 17.84 || 1.5 km || multiple || 1998–2021 || 08 Nov 2021 || 60 || align=left | Disc.: Spacewatch || 
|- id="1998 RT81" bgcolor=#fefefe
| 1 ||  || MBA-I || 18.91 || data-sort-value="0.49" | 490 m || multiple || 1998–2022 || 25 Jan 2022 || 34 || align=left | Disc.: Spacewatch || 
|- id="1998 RU81" bgcolor=#E9E9E9
| 0 ||  || MBA-M || 17.12 || 2.1 km || multiple || 1998–2021 || 30 Oct 2021 || 101 || align=left | Disc.: Spacewatch || 
|- id="1998 RV81" bgcolor=#fefefe
| 0 ||  || MBA-I || 19.52 || data-sort-value="0.37" | 370 m || multiple || 1998–2021 || 28 Sep 2021 || 28 || align=left | Disc.: Spacewatch || 
|- id="1998 RW81" bgcolor=#d6d6d6
| 1 ||  || MBA-O || 17.5 || 1.8 km || multiple || 1998–2019 || 19 Dec 2019 || 31 || align=left | Disc.: DB MissingAdded on 22 July 2020 || 
|- id="1998 RX81" bgcolor=#fefefe
| 2 ||  || MBA-I || 19.0 || data-sort-value="0.47" | 470 m || multiple || 1998–2020 || 07 Sep 2020 || 40 || align=left | Disc.: DB MissingAdded on 19 October 2020 || 
|- id="1998 RY81" bgcolor=#d6d6d6
| 0 ||  || MBA-O || 17.08 || 2.1 km || multiple || 1998–2021 || 28 Oct 2021 || 55 || align=left | Disc.: SpacewatchAdded on 5 November 2021 || 
|}
back to top

S 

|- id="1998 SM" bgcolor=#E9E9E9
| 0 || 1998 SM || MBA-M || 17.81 || 1.5 km || multiple || 1998–2021 || 27 Oct 2021 || 89 || align=left | Disc.: Spacewatch || 
|- id="1998 SZ1" bgcolor=#fefefe
| 0 ||  || MBA-I || 17.5 || data-sort-value="0.94" | 940 m || multiple || 1998–2021 || 14 Jan 2021 || 201 || align=left | Disc.: ODASAlt.: 2009 VZ103, 2013 YP50 || 
|- id="1998 SG2" bgcolor=#FFC2E0
| 1 ||  || AMO || 19.3 || data-sort-value="0.49" | 490 m || multiple || 1998–2018 || 12 Jul 2018 || 196 || align=left | Disc.: LONEOS || 
|- id="1998 SH2" bgcolor=#FFC2E0
| 0 ||  || APO || 20.8 || data-sort-value="0.383" | 383 m || multiple || 1998–2016 || 27 Oct 2016 || 144 || align=left | Disc.: SpacewatchPotentially hazardous objectAlt.: 2016 EC156 || 
|- id="1998 SP4" bgcolor=#E9E9E9
| 1 ||  || MBA-M || 18.8 || data-sort-value="0.73" | 730 m || multiple || 1998–2021 || 03 Jan 2021 || 61 || align=left | Disc.: SpacewatchAlt.: 2011 SF2 || 
|- id="1998 SS4" bgcolor=#FFC2E0
| 6 ||  || AMO || 21.8 || data-sort-value="0.16" | 160 m || single || 24 days || 13 Oct 1998 || 36 || align=left | Disc.: LINEAR || 
|- id="1998 SU4" bgcolor=#FFC2E0
| 5 ||  || APO || 21.3 || data-sort-value="0.20" | 200 m || multiple || 1998–2014 || 30 Sep 2014 || 93 || align=left | Disc.: LINEARPotentially hazardous object || 
|- id="1998 SG7" bgcolor=#d6d6d6
| 2 ||  || MBA-O || 17.7 || 1.6 km || multiple || 1998–2019 || 03 Dec 2019 || 30 || align=left | Disc.: Spacewatch || 
|- id="1998 SQ7" bgcolor=#E9E9E9
| 1 ||  || MBA-M || 18.0 || data-sort-value="0.75" | 750 m || multiple || 1998–2019 || 26 Nov 2019 || 46 || align=left | Disc.: SpacewatchAlt.: 2002 QX55 || 
|- id="1998 SE8" bgcolor=#d6d6d6
| 0 ||  || MBA-O || 16.7 || 2.5 km || multiple || 1998–2021 || 07 Jan 2021 || 53 || align=left | Disc.: Spacewatch || 
|- id="1998 SD9" bgcolor=#FFC2E0
| 0 ||  || ATE || 24.09 || data-sort-value="0.054" | 54 m || multiple || 2008–2018 || 15 Sep 2018 || 115 || align=left | Disc.: LINEAR || 
|- id="1998 ST12" bgcolor=#d6d6d6
| 1 ||  || MBA-O || 16.8 || 2.4 km || multiple || 1998–2021 || 08 Jan 2021 || 415 || align=left | Disc.: CSSAlt.: 2009 QC52 || 
|- id="1998 SY14" bgcolor=#FFC2E0
| 5 ||  || APO || 20.6 || data-sort-value="0.27" | 270 m || single || 125 days || 24 Jan 1999 || 68 || align=left | Disc.: LINEARPotentially hazardous object || 
|- id="1998 SZ14" bgcolor=#FFC2E0
| 2 ||  || AMO || 19.1 || data-sort-value="0.54" | 540 m || multiple || 1998–2014 || 02 Jan 2014 || 66 || align=left | Disc.: LINEARAlt.: 2013 WK103 || 
|- id="1998 SL15" bgcolor=#fefefe
| 0 ||  || MBA-I || 18.3 || data-sort-value="0.65" | 650 m || multiple || 1998–2020 || 15 Sep 2020 || 97 || align=left | Disc.: Spacewatch || 
|- id="1998 SM16" bgcolor=#fefefe
| 0 ||  || MBA-I || 18.25 || data-sort-value="0.67" | 670 m || multiple || 1998–2022 || 27 Jan 2022 || 66 || align=left | Disc.: SpacewatchAlt.: 2011 CQ77 || 
|- id="1998 SW17" bgcolor=#d6d6d6
| 0 ||  || MBA-O || 16.8 || 2.4 km || multiple || 1998–2021 || 18 Jan 2021 || 109 || align=left | Disc.: Spacewatch || 
|- id="1998 SC18" bgcolor=#fefefe
| 0 ||  || MBA-I || 17.6 || data-sort-value="0.90" | 900 m || multiple || 1998–2021 || 18 Jan 2021 || 152 || align=left | Disc.: SpacewatchAlt.: 2007 DL62, 2009 WN255 || 
|- id="1998 SL18" bgcolor=#E9E9E9
| 0 ||  || MBA-M || 17.9 || 1.1 km || multiple || 1998–2021 || 07 Jan 2021 || 52 || align=left | Disc.: SpacewatchAdded on 22 July 2020Alt.: 2011 SL202 || 
|- id="1998 ST18" bgcolor=#d6d6d6
| 0 ||  || MBA-O || 17.07 || 2.1 km || multiple || 1998–2021 || 30 May 2021 || 47 || align=left | Disc.: SpacewatchAlt.: 2003 UV408 || 
|- id="1998 SA21" bgcolor=#fefefe
| 0 ||  || MBA-I || 17.56 || data-sort-value="0.91" | 910 m || multiple || 1994–2021 || 27 Nov 2021 || 206 || align=left | Disc.: SpacewatchAlt.: 2002 VA147, 2017 NV6 || 
|- id="1998 ST21" bgcolor=#FA8072
| – ||  || HUN || 19.5 || data-sort-value="0.37" | 370 m || single || 9 days || 30 Sep 1998 || 12 || align=left | Disc.: Spacewatch || 
|- id="1998 SJ27" bgcolor=#fefefe
| 0 ||  || MBA-I || 17.76 || data-sort-value="0.83" | 830 m || multiple || 1998–2022 || 24 Jan 2022 || 79 || align=left | Disc.: Woomera Obs.Alt.: 2020 KG1 || 
|- id="1998 SG28" bgcolor=#d6d6d6
| 2 ||  || MBA-O || 17.9 || 1.5 km || multiple || 1998–2020 || 23 Sep 2020 || 32 || align=left | Disc.: SpacewatchAdded on 19 October 2020 || 
|- id="1998 SH28" bgcolor=#FA8072
| 2 ||  || MCA || 19.7 || data-sort-value="0.34" | 340 m || multiple || 1998–2018 || 14 Aug 2018 || 22 || align=left | Disc.: SpacewatchAdded on 24 December 2021 || 
|- id="1998 SO28" bgcolor=#d6d6d6
| 0 ||  || MBA-O || 16.3 || 3.1 km || multiple || 1998–2020 || 24 Jan 2020 || 113 || align=left | Disc.: SpacewatchAlt.: 2014 WA437 || 
|- id="1998 SC30" bgcolor=#fefefe
| 0 ||  || MBA-I || 18.29 || data-sort-value="0.65" | 650 m || multiple || 1998–2021 || 07 Nov 2021 || 126 || align=left | Disc.: SpacewatchAlt.: 2013 SH1 || 
|- id="1998 SB31" bgcolor=#fefefe
| 0 ||  || MBA-I || 18.2 || data-sort-value="0.68" | 680 m || multiple || 1998–2019 || 29 Oct 2019 || 79 || align=left | Disc.: SpacewatchAlt.: 2012 SH27, 2015 HR58 || 
|- id="1998 SH31" bgcolor=#d6d6d6
| 0 ||  || MBA-O || 16.4 || 2.9 km || multiple || 1998–2020 || 20 Oct 2020 || 111 || align=left | Disc.: Spacewatch || 
|- id="1998 SQ33" bgcolor=#E9E9E9
| – ||  || MBA-M || 18.0 || 1.4 km || single || 11 days || 27 Sep 1998 || 19 || align=left | Disc.: LINEAR || 
|- id="1998 SE35" bgcolor=#FFC2E0
| 1 ||  || AMO || 19.3 || data-sort-value="0.49" | 490 m || multiple || 1998–2020 || 19 Jan 2020 || 118 || align=left | Disc.: LINEAR || 
|- id="1998 SX35" bgcolor=#fefefe
| 0 ||  || MBA-I || 17.99 || data-sort-value="0.75" | 750 m || multiple || 1998–2021 || 15 Apr 2021 || 118 || align=left | Disc.: ODAS || 
|- id="1998 SL36" bgcolor=#FFC2E0
| 0 ||  || APO || 20.23 || data-sort-value="0.32" | 320 m || multiple || 1998–2021 || 22 Oct 2021 || 230 || align=left | Disc.: SpacewatchPotentially hazardous object || 
|- id="1998 SU36" bgcolor=#E9E9E9
| 1 ||  || MBA-M || 18.7 || data-sort-value="0.76" | 760 m || multiple || 1998–2020 || 14 Dec 2020 || 96 || align=left | Disc.: SpacewatchAlt.: 2007 VY60 || 
|- id="1998 SB39" bgcolor=#d6d6d6
| 0 ||  || MBA-O || 17.41 || 1.8 km || multiple || 1998–2021 || 19 Aug 2021 || 72 || align=left | Disc.: SpacewatchAlt.: 2015 VQ79 || 
|- id="1998 SE39" bgcolor=#E9E9E9
| 3 ||  || MBA-M || 18.6 || data-sort-value="0.80" | 800 m || multiple || 1998–2020 || 17 Oct 2020 || 34 || align=left | Disc.: SpacewatchAlt.: 2020 QN35 || 
|- id="1998 SM40" bgcolor=#E9E9E9
| 0 ||  || MBA-M || 18.2 || data-sort-value="0.96" | 960 m || multiple || 1998–2020 || 12 Nov 2020 || 51 || align=left | Disc.: SpacewatchAlt.: 2007 VX134 || 
|- id="1998 SP40" bgcolor=#fefefe
| 1 ||  || MBA-I || 19.6 || data-sort-value="0.36" | 360 m || multiple || 1998–2020 || 20 Oct 2020 || 74 || align=left | Disc.: Spacewatch || 
|- id="1998 SB41" bgcolor=#d6d6d6
| 0 ||  || MBA-O || 17.0 || 2.2 km || multiple || 1998–2021 || 17 Jan 2021 || 85 || align=left | Disc.: SpacewatchAlt.: 2006 DR156 || 
|- id="1998 SE41" bgcolor=#E9E9E9
| 2 ||  || MBA-M || 18.5 || data-sort-value="0.59" | 590 m || multiple || 1998–2020 || 20 Feb 2020 || 35 || align=left | Disc.: SpacewatchAlt.: 2016 CP68 || 
|- id="1998 SH41" bgcolor=#fefefe
| 2 ||  || MBA-I || 18.7 || data-sort-value="0.54" | 540 m || multiple || 1998–2019 || 25 Sep 2019 || 37 || align=left | Disc.: SpacewatchAlt.: 2005 SW194 || 
|- id="1998 ST41" bgcolor=#fefefe
| – ||  || MBA-I || 18.8 || data-sort-value="0.52" | 520 m || single || 9 days || 28 Sep 1998 || 10 || align=left | Disc.: Spacewatch || 
|- id="1998 SV41" bgcolor=#fefefe
| 1 ||  || MBA-I || 19.6 || data-sort-value="0.36" | 360 m || multiple || 1998–2020 || 14 Dec 2020 || 42 || align=left | Disc.: SpacewatchAlt.: 2009 VH9, 2009 WC265, 2009 WN296 || 
|- id="1998 SW41" bgcolor=#FA8072
| 0 ||  || MCA || 18.1 || 1.3 km || multiple || 1998–2021 || 03 Dec 2021 || 69 || align=left | Disc.: SpacewatchAdded on 5 November 2021 || 
|- id="1998 SM44" bgcolor=#fefefe
| 0 ||  || MBA-I || 17.8 || data-sort-value="0.82" | 820 m || multiple || 1998–2020 || 14 Dec 2020 || 94 || align=left | Disc.: Spacewatch || 
|- id="1998 SR44" bgcolor=#d6d6d6
| 1 ||  || MBA-O || 17.3 || 1.9 km || multiple || 1998–2020 || 12 Dec 2020 || 83 || align=left | Disc.: SpacewatchAlt.: 2009 RG49 || 
|- id="1998 SV48" bgcolor=#d6d6d6
| 0 ||  || MBA-O || 17.5 || 1.8 km || multiple || 1998–2019 || 20 Dec 2019 || 85 || align=left | Disc.: SpacewatchAlt.: 2003 SR171 || 
|- id="1998 SC50" bgcolor=#E9E9E9
| 0 ||  || MBA-M || 17.1 || 1.6 km || multiple || 1998–2021 || 09 Jan 2021 || 118 || align=left | Disc.: SpacewatchAlt.: 2011 SH157 || 
|- id="1998 SJ52" bgcolor=#fefefe
| 1 ||  || MBA-I || 18.3 || data-sort-value="0.65" | 650 m || multiple || 1998–2020 || 13 Jul 2020 || 71 || align=left | Disc.: SpacewatchAdded on 22 July 2020Alt.: 2009 QT4 || 
|- id="1998 SM52" bgcolor=#d6d6d6
| 0 ||  || MBA-O || 17.38 || 1.9 km || multiple || 1998–2021 || 30 Nov 2021 || 68 || align=left | Disc.: SpacewatchAlt.: 2009 SG196 || 
|- id="1998 SJ91" bgcolor=#d6d6d6
| 2 ||  || MBA-O || 16.7 || 2.5 km || multiple || 1998–2017 || 15 Dec 2017 || 33 || align=left | Disc.: LINEARAlt.: 2004 RA89 || 
|- id="1998 SE94" bgcolor=#E9E9E9
| 0 ||  || MBA-M || 17.8 || 1.2 km || multiple || 1998–2020 || 15 Dec 2020 || 154 || align=left | Disc.: LINEAR || 
|- id="1998 SE150" bgcolor=#d6d6d6
| 0 ||  || MBA-O || 17.2 || 2.0 km || multiple || 1998–2020 || 16 Dec 2020 || 103 || align=left | Disc.: LINEARAlt.: 1998 TX3, 2009 WR27 || 
|- id="1998 SD151" bgcolor=#d6d6d6
| 0 ||  || MBA-O || 16.6 || 2.8 km || multiple || 1998–2021 || 17 Jan 2021 || 146 || align=left | Disc.: LINEARAlt.: 2010 EU154, 2014 WO498 || 
|- id="1998 SS167" bgcolor=#E9E9E9
| 2 ||  || MBA-M || 18.4 || data-sort-value="0.88" | 880 m || multiple || 1998–2020 || 17 Oct 2020 || 52 || align=left | Disc.: SpacewatchAdded on 17 January 2021 || 
|- id="1998 SQ170" bgcolor=#fefefe
| 0 ||  || MBA-I || 17.5 || data-sort-value="0.94" | 940 m || multiple || 1998–2021 || 01 Feb 2021 || 263 || align=left | Disc.: LONEOSAdded on 11 May 2021Alt.: 2013 YH107 || 
|- id="1998 SJ172" bgcolor=#fefefe
| 0 ||  || MBA-I || 19.14 || data-sort-value="0.44" | 440 m || multiple || 1998–2021 || 10 Jan 2021 || 37 || align=left | —Added on 29 January 2022 || 
|- id="1998 SL172" bgcolor=#E9E9E9
| 0 ||  || MBA-M || 18.0 || 1.1 km || multiple || 1998–2019 || 04 Aug 2019 || 47 || align=left | Disc.: SDSS || 
|- id="1998 SM172" bgcolor=#E9E9E9
| 0 ||  || MBA-M || 17.9 || 1.1 km || multiple || 1998–2020 || 10 Dec 2020 || 75 || align=left | Disc.: SDSSAdded on 22 July 2020Alt.: 2007 VF29 || 
|- id="1998 SF173" bgcolor=#E9E9E9
| 0 ||  || MBA-M || 18.28 || 1.2 km || multiple || 1998–2021 || 27 Oct 2021 || 49 || align=left | Disc.: SDSSAdded on 5 November 2021 || 
|- id="1998 ST173" bgcolor=#d6d6d6
| 0 ||  || MBA-O || 15.88 || 3.7 km || multiple || 1996–2022 || 27 Jan 2022 || 161 || align=left | Disc.: SDSSAlt.: 2014 SH157, 2019 TP22 || 
|- id="1998 SV173" bgcolor=#fefefe
| 0 ||  || MBA-I || 18.3 || data-sort-value="0.65" | 650 m || multiple || 1998–2020 || 08 Dec 2020 || 97 || align=left | Disc.: SDSS || 
|- id="1998 SB174" bgcolor=#d6d6d6
| 0 ||  || MBA-O || 16.75 || 2.5 km || multiple || 1998–2021 || 08 Dec 2021 || 67 || align=left | Disc.: SDSSAdded on 19 October 2020 || 
|- id="1998 SO174" bgcolor=#d6d6d6
| 0 ||  || MBA-O || 17.13 || 2.1 km || multiple || 1998–2021 || 09 Dec 2021 || 88 || align=left | Disc.: SDSS || 
|- id="1998 SS174" bgcolor=#E9E9E9
| 0 ||  || MBA-M || 18.08 || 1.3 km || multiple || 1998–2021 || 08 Nov 2021 || 37 || align=left | Disc.: SDSS || 
|- id="1998 SF175" bgcolor=#d6d6d6
| 0 ||  || MBA-O || 16.2 || 3.2 km || multiple || 1998–2020 || 05 Nov 2020 || 79 || align=left | Disc.: SDSSAdded on 22 July 2020 || 
|- id="1998 SH175" bgcolor=#E9E9E9
| 0 ||  || MBA-M || 17.96 || 1.4 km || multiple || 1998–2021 || 06 Nov 2021 || 46 || align=left | Disc.: SDSSAdded on 5 November 2021 || 
|- id="1998 SS176" bgcolor=#d6d6d6
| 0 ||  || MBA-O || 16.85 || 2.4 km || multiple || 1998–2021 || 30 Nov 2021 || 85 || align=left | Disc.: SDSSAlt.: 2015 UC22 || 
|- id="1998 SX176" bgcolor=#fefefe
| 1 ||  || MBA-I || 19.1 || data-sort-value="0.45" | 450 m || multiple || 1998–2022 || 01 Sep 2022 || 30 || align=left | Disc.: Spacewatch || 
|- id="1998 SZ176" bgcolor=#fefefe
| 3 ||  || MBA-I || 18.9 || data-sort-value="0.49" | 490 m || multiple || 1998–2016 || 22 Nov 2016 || 29 || align=left | Disc.: SDSSAlt.: 2016 WP5 || 
|- id="1998 SF177" bgcolor=#d6d6d6
| 0 ||  || MBA-O || 16.9 || 2.3 km || multiple || 1995–2021 || 15 Apr 2021 || 56 || align=left | Disc.: SDSSAdded on 17 June 2021 || 
|- id="1998 SG177" bgcolor=#d6d6d6
| 0 ||  || MBA-O || 16.47 || 2.8 km || multiple || 1998–2022 || 21 Jan 2022 || 105 || align=left | Disc.: SDSSAdded on 22 July 2020Alt.: 2010 VQ115 || 
|- id="1998 SQ177" bgcolor=#fefefe
| 0 ||  || MBA-I || 17.76 || data-sort-value="0.83" | 830 m || multiple || 1998–2021 || 08 Aug 2021 || 178 || align=left | Disc.: SDSS || 
|- id="1998 SS177" bgcolor=#fefefe
| 0 ||  || MBA-I || 17.55 || data-sort-value="0.92" | 920 m || multiple || 1998–2022 || 22 Jan 2022 || 133 || align=left | Disc.: SDSS || 
|- id="1998 ST177" bgcolor=#E9E9E9
| 0 ||  || MBA-M || 17.34 || 1.9 km || multiple || 1998–2021 || 12 Sep 2021 || 98 || align=left | Disc.: SDSSAlt.: 2010 LA137 || 
|- id="1998 SU177" bgcolor=#fefefe
| 0 ||  || MBA-I || 18.5 || data-sort-value="0.59" | 590 m || multiple || 1998–2021 || 18 Jan 2021 || 98 || align=left | Disc.: SDSS || 
|- id="1998 SX177" bgcolor=#d6d6d6
| 0 ||  || MBA-O || 16.14 || 3.3 km || multiple || 1998–2021 || 05 Dec 2021 || 206 || align=left | Disc.: SDSS || 
|- id="1998 SY177" bgcolor=#fefefe
| 0 ||  || MBA-I || 17.82 || data-sort-value="0.81" | 810 m || multiple || 1998–2021 || 09 Dec 2021 || 111 || align=left | Disc.: SDSS || 
|- id="1998 SZ177" bgcolor=#E9E9E9
| 0 ||  || MBA-M || 17.16 || 1.6 km || multiple || 1998–2022 || 27 Jan 2022 || 110 || align=left | Disc.: SDSS || 
|- id="1998 SA178" bgcolor=#fefefe
| 0 ||  || MBA-I || 17.98 || data-sort-value="0.75" | 750 m || multiple || 1998–2021 || 31 Jul 2021 || 97 || align=left | Disc.: SDSS || 
|- id="1998 SB178" bgcolor=#d6d6d6
| 0 ||  || MBA-O || 16.86 || 2.4 km || multiple || 1998–2022 || 24 Jan 2022 || 75 || align=left | Disc.: SDSS || 
|- id="1998 SC178" bgcolor=#E9E9E9
| 0 ||  || MBA-M || 17.34 || 1.9 km || multiple || 1998–2021 || 15 Aug 2021 || 110 || align=left | Disc.: SDSS || 
|- id="1998 SD178" bgcolor=#d6d6d6
| 0 ||  || MBA-O || 17.2 || 2.0 km || multiple || 1998–2019 || 04 Dec 2019 || 80 || align=left | Disc.: SDSS || 
|- id="1998 SE178" bgcolor=#E9E9E9
| 0 ||  || MBA-M || 17.44 || 1.4 km || multiple || 1998–2022 || 27 Jan 2022 || 80 || align=left | Disc.: SDSS || 
|- id="1998 SF178" bgcolor=#d6d6d6
| 0 ||  || MBA-O || 17.18 || 2.0 km || multiple || 1998–2021 || 15 Apr 2021 || 99 || align=left | Disc.: SDSS || 
|- id="1998 SG178" bgcolor=#E9E9E9
| 0 ||  || MBA-M || 17.43 || 1.8 km || multiple || 1998–2021 || 07 Oct 2021 || 73 || align=left | Disc.: SDSS || 
|- id="1998 SH178" bgcolor=#d6d6d6
| 0 ||  || MBA-O || 15.79 || 3.9 km || multiple || 1998–2022 || 25 Jan 2022 || 149 || align=left | Disc.: SDSS || 
|- id="1998 SJ178" bgcolor=#fefefe
| 0 ||  || MBA-I || 18.01 || data-sort-value="0.74" | 740 m || multiple || 1998–2021 || 02 Dec 2021 || 104 || align=left | Disc.: SDSS || 
|- id="1998 SL178" bgcolor=#fefefe
| 0 ||  || MBA-I || 18.22 || data-sort-value="0.67" | 670 m || multiple || 1998–2021 || 25 Nov 2021 || 98 || align=left | Disc.: SDSS || 
|- id="1998 SM178" bgcolor=#E9E9E9
| 0 ||  || MBA-M || 17.1 || 1.6 km || multiple || 1998–2021 || 16 Jan 2021 || 101 || align=left | Disc.: SDSSAlt.: 2010 JB101 || 
|- id="1998 SN178" bgcolor=#fefefe
| 0 ||  || MBA-I || 18.41 || data-sort-value="0.62" | 620 m || multiple || 1998–2022 || 27 Jan 2022 || 85 || align=left | Disc.: SDSS || 
|- id="1998 SP178" bgcolor=#E9E9E9
| 0 ||  || MBA-M || 17.6 || 1.3 km || multiple || 1998–2021 || 18 Jan 2021 || 104 || align=left | Disc.: SDSS || 
|- id="1998 SQ178" bgcolor=#E9E9E9
| 0 ||  || MBA-M || 16.8 || 1.3 km || multiple || 1998–2021 || 01 Jun 2021 || 82 || align=left | Disc.: SDSS || 
|- id="1998 SR178" bgcolor=#E9E9E9
| 0 ||  || MBA-M || 17.2 || 1.5 km || multiple || 1998–2020 || 11 Nov 2020 || 77 || align=left | Disc.: SDSS || 
|- id="1998 SS178" bgcolor=#fefefe
| 0 ||  || MBA-I || 18.6 || data-sort-value="0.57" | 570 m || multiple || 1998–2019 || 02 Sep 2019 || 95 || align=left | Disc.: SDSS || 
|- id="1998 ST178" bgcolor=#d6d6d6
| 0 ||  || MBA-O || 15.9 || 3.7 km || multiple || 1998–2021 || 01 Dec 2021 || 105 || align=left | Disc.: SDSS || 
|- id="1998 SU178" bgcolor=#fefefe
| 0 ||  || MBA-I || 18.3 || data-sort-value="0.65" | 650 m || multiple || 1996–2021 || 11 Jan 2021 || 107 || align=left | Disc.: SDSS || 
|- id="1998 SV178" bgcolor=#E9E9E9
| 0 ||  || MBA-M || 17.48 || 1.8 km || multiple || 1998–2021 || 03 Oct 2021 || 73 || align=left | Disc.: SDSS || 
|- id="1998 SW178" bgcolor=#fefefe
| 0 ||  || MBA-I || 18.13 || data-sort-value="0.70" | 700 m || multiple || 1998–2022 || 25 Jan 2022 || 107 || align=left | Disc.: Spacewatch || 
|- id="1998 SZ178" bgcolor=#fefefe
| 0 ||  || MBA-I || 17.7 || data-sort-value="0.86" | 860 m || multiple || 1998–2021 || 17 Jan 2021 || 98 || align=left | Disc.: SDSS || 
|- id="1998 SA179" bgcolor=#d6d6d6
| 0 ||  || MBA-O || 16.4 || 2.9 km || multiple || 1993–2020 || 19 Dec 2020 || 85 || align=left | Disc.: SpacewatchAlt.: 1993 UR1 || 
|- id="1998 SB179" bgcolor=#d6d6d6
| 0 ||  || MBA-O || 17.2 || 2.0 km || multiple || 1998–2018 || 08 Aug 2018 || 53 || align=left | Disc.: SDSS || 
|- id="1998 SD179" bgcolor=#fefefe
| 0 ||  || MBA-I || 18.68 || data-sort-value="0.55" | 550 m || multiple || 1998–2021 || 07 Apr 2021 || 100 || align=left | Disc.: SDSS || 
|- id="1998 SE179" bgcolor=#fefefe
| 0 ||  || MBA-I || 18.50 || data-sort-value="0.59" | 590 m || multiple || 1998–2021 || 30 Sep 2021 || 77 || align=left | Disc.: SDSS || 
|- id="1998 SF179" bgcolor=#fefefe
| 0 ||  || MBA-I || 18.5 || data-sort-value="0.59" | 590 m || multiple || 1998–2019 || 25 Oct 2019 || 51 || align=left | Disc.: SDSS || 
|- id="1998 SG179" bgcolor=#d6d6d6
| 0 ||  || MBA-O || 17.36 || 1.9 km || multiple || 1998–2021 || 20 Apr 2021 || 49 || align=left | Disc.: SDSS || 
|- id="1998 SH179" bgcolor=#fefefe
| 0 ||  || MBA-I || 18.13 || data-sort-value="0.70" | 700 m || multiple || 1994–2021 || 27 Oct 2021 || 152 || align=left | Disc.: Spacewatch || 
|- id="1998 SK179" bgcolor=#fefefe
| 0 ||  || MBA-I || 18.2 || data-sort-value="0.68" | 680 m || multiple || 1998–2019 || 31 May 2019 || 47 || align=left | Disc.: SDSS || 
|- id="1998 SL179" bgcolor=#fefefe
| 0 ||  || MBA-I || 18.62 || data-sort-value="0.56" | 560 m || multiple || 1998–2021 || 08 May 2021 || 78 || align=left | Disc.: SDSS || 
|- id="1998 SM179" bgcolor=#fefefe
| 0 ||  || MBA-I || 18.24 || data-sort-value="0.67" | 670 m || multiple || 1998–2021 || 29 Nov 2021 || 113 || align=left | Disc.: SDSSAlt.: 2013 SW8 || 
|- id="1998 SO179" bgcolor=#E9E9E9
| 0 ||  || MBA-M || 17.37 || 1.9 km || multiple || 1998–2021 || 27 Oct 2021 || 67 || align=left | Disc.: SDSS || 
|- id="1998 SP179" bgcolor=#fefefe
| 0 ||  || MBA-I || 18.61 || data-sort-value="0.56" | 560 m || multiple || 1998–2021 || 01 Oct 2021 || 69 || align=left | Disc.: SDSS || 
|- id="1998 SQ179" bgcolor=#fefefe
| 0 ||  || MBA-I || 18.68 || data-sort-value="0.55" | 550 m || multiple || 1998–2022 || 27 Jan 2022 || 65 || align=left | Disc.: SDSS || 
|- id="1998 SR179" bgcolor=#d6d6d6
| 0 ||  || MBA-O || 17.52 || 1.7 km || multiple || 1998–2021 || 14 Jun 2021 || 50 || align=left | Disc.: SDSS || 
|- id="1998 SS179" bgcolor=#C2FFFF
| 0 ||  || JT || 14.27 || 7.8 km || multiple || 1998–2021 || 27 Nov 2021 || 132 || align=left | Disc.: SDSSGreek camp (L4) || 
|- id="1998 ST179" bgcolor=#d6d6d6
| 0 ||  || MBA-O || 17.27 || 2.0 km || multiple || 1998–2021 || 05 Jul 2021 || 76 || align=left | Disc.: SDSS || 
|- id="1998 SV179" bgcolor=#fefefe
| 0 ||  || MBA-I || 17.98 || data-sort-value="0.75" | 750 m || multiple || 1998–2021 || 28 Oct 2021 || 94 || align=left | Disc.: Spacewatch || 
|- id="1998 SW179" bgcolor=#fefefe
| 0 ||  || MBA-I || 18.5 || data-sort-value="0.59" | 590 m || multiple || 1998–2020 || 23 Jul 2020 || 99 || align=left | Disc.: SDSS || 
|- id="1998 SX179" bgcolor=#fefefe
| 0 ||  || MBA-I || 18.9 || data-sort-value="0.49" | 490 m || multiple || 1998–2020 || 14 Nov 2020 || 68 || align=left | Disc.: SDSS || 
|- id="1998 SY179" bgcolor=#fefefe
| 0 ||  || MBA-I || 18.2 || data-sort-value="0.68" | 680 m || multiple || 1998–2020 || 15 Oct 2020 || 46 || align=left | Disc.: SDSS || 
|- id="1998 SZ179" bgcolor=#E9E9E9
| 0 ||  || MBA-M || 18.77 || data-sort-value="0.52" | 520 m || multiple || 1998–2018 || 14 Sep 2018 || 66 || align=left | Disc.: SDSSAlt.: 2010 KH60 || 
|- id="1998 SA180" bgcolor=#fefefe
| 1 ||  || MBA-I || 19.07 || data-sort-value="0.46" | 460 m || multiple || 1998–2022 || 27 Jan 2022 || 51 || align=left | Disc.: SDSS || 
|- id="1998 SB180" bgcolor=#d6d6d6
| 0 ||  || MBA-O || 16.54 || 2.7 km || multiple || 1998–2022 || 26 Jan 2022 || 119 || align=left | Disc.: SDSS || 
|- id="1998 SC180" bgcolor=#E9E9E9
| 0 ||  || MBA-M || 17.93 || 1.4 km || multiple || 1998–2021 || 09 Dec 2021 || 65 || align=left | Disc.: SDSS || 
|- id="1998 SD180" bgcolor=#d6d6d6
| 0 ||  || MBA-O || 16.8 || 2.4 km || multiple || 1998–2020 || 15 Oct 2020 || 49 || align=left | Disc.: SDSS || 
|- id="1998 SE180" bgcolor=#fefefe
| 1 ||  || MBA-I || 18.7 || data-sort-value="0.54" | 540 m || multiple || 1998–2016 || 06 Dec 2016 || 31 || align=left | Disc.: Spacewatch || 
|- id="1998 SF180" bgcolor=#fefefe
| 0 ||  || MBA-I || 18.6 || data-sort-value="0.57" | 570 m || multiple || 1998–2020 || 17 Oct 2020 || 58 || align=left | Disc.: SDSS || 
|- id="1998 SG180" bgcolor=#fefefe
| 0 ||  || MBA-I || 18.4 || data-sort-value="0.62" | 620 m || multiple || 1998–2019 || 19 Dec 2019 || 73 || align=left | Disc.: SDSS || 
|- id="1998 SH180" bgcolor=#d6d6d6
| 0 ||  || MBA-O || 16.9 || 2.3 km || multiple || 1998–2020 || 24 Dec 2020 || 62 || align=left | Disc.: SDSS || 
|- id="1998 SJ180" bgcolor=#d6d6d6
| 0 ||  || MBA-O || 16.54 || 2.7 km || multiple || 1998–2021 || 27 Nov 2021 || 78 || align=left | Disc.: Spacewatch || 
|- id="1998 SK180" bgcolor=#d6d6d6
| 0 ||  || MBA-O || 17.44 || 1.8 km || multiple || 1998–2021 || 09 Apr 2021 || 56 || align=left | Disc.: SDSS || 
|- id="1998 SL180" bgcolor=#E9E9E9
| 0 ||  || MBA-M || 17.91 || 1.5 km || multiple || 1998–2021 || 05 Oct 2021 || 76 || align=left | Disc.: SDSS || 
|- id="1998 SM180" bgcolor=#fefefe
| 2 ||  || MBA-I || 18.4 || data-sort-value="0.62" | 620 m || multiple || 1998–2021 || 01 Dec 2021 || 33 || align=left | Disc.: SDSS || 
|- id="1998 SN180" bgcolor=#E9E9E9
| 0 ||  || MBA-M || 18.38 || data-sort-value="0.63" | 630 m || multiple || 1998–2021 || 10 Apr 2021 || 61 || align=left | Disc.: SDSS || 
|- id="1998 SP180" bgcolor=#E9E9E9
| 0 ||  || MBA-M || 17.4 || data-sort-value="0.98" | 980 m || multiple || 1998–2020 || 10 Dec 2020 || 29 || align=left | Disc.: SDSS || 
|- id="1998 SQ180" bgcolor=#E9E9E9
| 0 ||  || MBA-M || 17.4 || 1.4 km || multiple || 1998–2020 || 22 Oct 2020 || 96 || align=left | Disc.: Spacewatch || 
|- id="1998 SR180" bgcolor=#fefefe
| 0 ||  || MBA-I || 18.0 || data-sort-value="0.75" | 750 m || multiple || 1998–2020 || 06 Dec 2020 || 99 || align=left | Disc.: SDSS || 
|- id="1998 SS180" bgcolor=#fefefe
| 0 ||  || MBA-I || 18.8 || data-sort-value="0.52" | 520 m || multiple || 1998–2020 || 16 Sep 2020 || 45 || align=left | Disc.: SDSS || 
|- id="1998 ST180" bgcolor=#E9E9E9
| 0 ||  || MBA-M || 17.81 || data-sort-value="0.81" | 810 m || multiple || 1998–2021 || 09 Apr 2021 || 40 || align=left | Disc.: SDSS || 
|- id="1998 SU180" bgcolor=#fefefe
| 0 ||  || MBA-I || 18.9 || data-sort-value="0.49" | 490 m || multiple || 1998–2017 || 16 Nov 2017 || 39 || align=left | Disc.: Spacewatch || 
|- id="1998 SV180" bgcolor=#E9E9E9
| 0 ||  || MBA-M || 17.70 || 1.2 km || multiple || 1998–2022 || 10 Jan 2022 || 44 || align=left | Disc.: SDSS || 
|- id="1998 SW180" bgcolor=#fefefe
| 0 ||  || MBA-I || 19.1 || data-sort-value="0.45" | 450 m || multiple || 1998–2020 || 05 Nov 2020 || 56 || align=left | Disc.: SDSS || 
|- id="1998 SX180" bgcolor=#E9E9E9
| 4 ||  || MBA-M || 18.0 || 1.4 km || multiple || 1998–2012 || 14 Oct 2012 || 14 || align=left | Disc.: SDSS || 
|- id="1998 SY180" bgcolor=#E9E9E9
| 0 ||  || MBA-M || 18.1 || 1.0 km || multiple || 1998–2015 || 09 Sep 2015 || 30 || align=left | Disc.: SDSS || 
|- id="1998 SZ180" bgcolor=#E9E9E9
| 0 ||  || MBA-M || 17.71 || 1.6 km || multiple || 1998–2021 || 08 Nov 2021 || 74 || align=left | Disc.: SDSS || 
|- id="1998 SA181" bgcolor=#fefefe
| 0 ||  || MBA-I || 18.68 || data-sort-value="0.55" | 550 m || multiple || 1998–2021 || 29 Nov 2021 || 37 || align=left | Disc.: Spacewatch || 
|- id="1998 SB181" bgcolor=#d6d6d6
| 0 ||  || MBA-O || 17.30 || 1.9 km || multiple || 1998–2020 || 21 May 2020 || 63 || align=left | Disc.: SDSS || 
|- id="1998 SD181" bgcolor=#fefefe
| 0 ||  || MBA-I || 18.80 || data-sort-value="0.52" | 520 m || multiple || 1998–2021 || 02 Dec 2021 || 55 || align=left | Disc.: SDSS || 
|- id="1998 SE181" bgcolor=#fefefe
| 0 ||  || MBA-I || 19.44 || data-sort-value="0.38" | 380 m || multiple || 1998–2021 || 11 Jun 2021 || 32 || align=left | Disc.: SDSS || 
|- id="1998 SG181" bgcolor=#fefefe
| 0 ||  || MBA-I || 18.4 || data-sort-value="0.62" | 620 m || multiple || 1998–2020 || 13 Sep 2020 || 74 || align=left | Disc.: DB MissingAdded on 19 October 2020 || 
|- id="1998 SH181" bgcolor=#E9E9E9
| 0 ||  || MBA-M || 18.1 || 1.0 km || multiple || 1998–2020 || 11 Dec 2020 || 68 || align=left | Disc.: DB MissingAdded on 19 October 2020 || 
|- id="1998 SK181" bgcolor=#d6d6d6
| 2 ||  || MBA-O || 16.9 || 2.3 km || multiple || 1998–2020 || 16 Oct 2020 || 34 || align=left | Disc.: SDSSAdded on 17 January 2021 || 
|- id="1998 SL181" bgcolor=#fefefe
| 0 ||  || MBA-I || 17.9 || data-sort-value="0.78" | 780 m || multiple || 1998–2020 || 16 Oct 2020 || 30 || align=left | Disc.: SDSSAdded on 17 January 2021 || 
|- id="1998 SM181" bgcolor=#fefefe
| 3 ||  || MBA-I || 19.5 || data-sort-value="0.37" | 370 m || multiple || 1998–2020 || 14 Nov 2020 || 42 || align=left | Disc.: SpacewatchAdded on 17 January 2021 || 
|- id="1998 SN181" bgcolor=#E9E9E9
| 0 ||  || MBA-M || 17.8 || 1.2 km || multiple || 1998–2021 || 16 Jan 2021 || 44 || align=left | Disc.: SDSSAdded on 17 January 2021 || 
|- id="1998 SO181" bgcolor=#d6d6d6
| 0 ||  || MBA-O || 17.6 || 1.7 km || multiple || 1998–2021 || 15 Jan 2021 || 52 || align=left | Disc.: SDSSAdded on 9 March 2021 || 
|- id="1998 SP181" bgcolor=#d6d6d6
| 2 ||  || MBA-O || 18.0 || 1.4 km || multiple || 1998–2020 || 20 Oct 2020 || 22 || align=left | Disc.: SDSSAdded on 9 March 2021 || 
|- id="1998 SQ181" bgcolor=#fefefe
| 1 ||  || MBA-I || 19.6 || data-sort-value="0.36" | 360 m || multiple || 1998–2017 || 16 Oct 2017 || 30 || align=left | Disc.: SDSSAdded on 9 March 2021 || 
|- id="1998 SR181" bgcolor=#fefefe
| 0 ||  || MBA-I || 18.73 || data-sort-value="0.53" | 530 m || multiple || 1998–2021 || 09 Jun 2021 || 48 || align=left | Disc.: No observationsAdded on 17 June 2021 || 
|- id="1998 SS181" bgcolor=#fefefe
| 0 ||  || MBA-I || 18.5 || data-sort-value="0.59" | 590 m || multiple || 1998–2017 || 13 Nov 2017 || 38 || align=left | Disc.: SDSSAdded on 21 August 2021 || 
|- id="1998 ST181" bgcolor=#fefefe
| 1 ||  || MBA-I || 20.0 || data-sort-value="0.30" | 300 m || multiple || 1998–2018 || 13 Aug 2018 || 24 || align=left | Disc.: SDSSAdded on 21 August 2021 || 
|- id="1998 SU181" bgcolor=#d6d6d6
| 0 ||  || MBA-O || 18.16 || 1.3 km || multiple || 1998–2017 || 28 Sep 2017 || 37 || align=left | Disc.: SDSSAdded on 21 August 2021 || 
|- id="1998 SV181" bgcolor=#FA8072
| 0 ||  || MCA || 20.22 || data-sort-value="0.27" | 270 m || multiple || 1998–2021 || 06 Sep 2021 || 36 || align=left | Disc.: SDSSAdded on 21 August 2021 || 
|- id="1998 SW181" bgcolor=#E9E9E9
| 0 ||  || MBA-M || 18.1 || data-sort-value="0.71" | 710 m || multiple || 1998–2021 || 18 Jan 2021 || 47 || align=left | Disc.: SDSSAdded on 21 August 2021 || 
|- id="1998 SX181" bgcolor=#fefefe
| 0 ||  || MBA-I || 19.2 || data-sort-value="0.43" | 430 m || multiple || 1998–2021 || 06 Aug 2021 || 32 || align=left | Disc.: SDSSAdded on 21 August 2021 || 
|- id="1998 SY181" bgcolor=#E9E9E9
| 0 ||  || MBA-M || 17.8 || 1.5 km || multiple || 1998–2021 || 09 Sep 2021 || 51 || align=left | Disc.: No observationsAdded on 30 September 2021 || 
|- id="1998 SZ181" bgcolor=#d6d6d6
| 2 ||  || MBA-O || 17.51 || 1.8 km || multiple || 1998–2021 || 01 Nov 2021 || 37 || align=left | Disc.: SDSSAdded on 5 November 2021 || 
|- id="1998 SA182" bgcolor=#d6d6d6
| 0 ||  || MBA-O || 17.0 || 2.3 km || multiple || 1998–2023 || 19 Mar 2023 || 38 || align=left | Disc.: SDSSAdded on 24 December 2021 || 
|- id="1998 SB182" bgcolor=#E9E9E9
| 0 ||  || MBA-M || 17.7 || 1.6 km || multiple || 1998–2021 || 04 Oct 2021 || 130 || align=left | Disc.: SpacewatchAdded on 24 December 2021 || 
|- id="1998 SC182" bgcolor=#fefefe
| 0 ||  = (619169) || MBA-I || 18.4 || data-sort-value="0.62" | 620 m || multiple || 1998–2020 || 03 Jan 2020 || 42 || align=left | —Added on 29 January 2022 || 
|}
back to top

T 

|- id="1998 TT3" bgcolor=#FFC2E0
| 1 ||  || AMO || 18.8 || data-sort-value="0.62" | 620 m || multiple || 1998–2017 || 16 Apr 2017 || 132 || align=left | Disc.: LONEOS || 
|- id="1998 TB4" bgcolor=#E9E9E9
| 0 ||  || MBA-M || 18.1 || data-sort-value="0.71" | 710 m || multiple || 1998–2019 || 27 Nov 2019 || 38 || align=left | Disc.: Spacewatch || 
|- id="1998 TU4" bgcolor=#d6d6d6
| 0 ||  || MBA-O || 16.8 || 2.4 km || multiple || 1998–2021 || 11 Jan 2021 || 103 || align=left | Disc.: SpacewatchAlt.: 2009 WB140 || 
|- id="1998 TA5" bgcolor=#E9E9E9
| 4 ||  || MBA-M || 18.4 || data-sort-value="0.62" | 620 m || multiple || 1994–2002 || 16 Aug 2002 || 20 || align=left | Disc.: SpacewatchAlt.: 2002 PG123 || 
|- id="1998 TV7" bgcolor=#E9E9E9
| 0 ||  || MBA-M || 17.67 || data-sort-value="0.87" | 870 m || multiple || 1998–2021 || 14 Apr 2021 || 117 || align=left | Disc.: Spacewatch || 
|- id="1998 TG8" bgcolor=#E9E9E9
| 3 ||  || MBA-M || 17.73 || data-sort-value="0.86" | 860 m || multiple || 1998–2022 || 29 Jul 2022 || 23 || align=left | Disc.: Spacewatch || 
|- id="1998 TB9" bgcolor=#d6d6d6
| 0 ||  || MBA-O || 16.0 || 3.5 km || multiple || 1998–2021 || 07 Jan 2021 || 112 || align=left | Disc.: Spacewatch || 
|- id="1998 TX9" bgcolor=#E9E9E9
| 0 ||  || MBA-M || 17.96 || 1.0 km || multiple || 1998–2022 || 09 May 2022 || 58 || align=left | Disc.: Spacewatch || 
|- id="1998 TZ13" bgcolor=#fefefe
| 0 ||  || MBA-I || 18.5 || data-sort-value="0.59" | 590 m || multiple || 1998–2020 || 14 Nov 2020 || 67 || align=left | Disc.: SpacewatchAlt.: 2009 UM73 || 
|- id="1998 TZ14" bgcolor=#d6d6d6
| 0 ||  || MBA-O || 16.9 || 2.4 km || multiple || 1998-2021 || 03 Dec 2021 || 95 || align=left | Disc.: Spacewatch Alt.: 2015 KH9 || 
|- id="1998 TY19" bgcolor=#fefefe
| 0 ||  || HUN || 18.9 || data-sort-value="0.49" | 490 m || multiple || 1998–2019 || 17 Nov 2019 || 67 || align=left | Disc.: SpacewatchAlt.: 2011 SB26 || 
|- id="1998 TG20" bgcolor=#fefefe
| 5 ||  || MBA-I || 19.6 || data-sort-value="0.36" | 360 m || multiple || 1998–2015 || 23 Oct 2015 || 17 || align=left | Disc.: Spacewatch Added on 21 August 2021 || 
|- id="1998 TX21" bgcolor=#d6d6d6
| 0 ||  || MBA-O || 17.3 || 2.1 km || multiple || 1998–2021 || 09 Jan 2021 || 81 || align=left | Disc.: SpacewatchAlt.: 2010 DX50 || 
|- id="1998 TY21" bgcolor=#C2FFFF
| 0 ||  || JT || 14.26 || 7.8 km || multiple || 1998–2021 || 30 Nov 2021 || 92 || align=left | Disc.: SpacewatchGreek camp (L4) || 
|- id="1998 TY22" bgcolor=#d6d6d6
| 0 ||  || MBA-O || 16.49 || 2.8 km || multiple || 1998–2021 || 30 Dec 2021 || 193 || align=left | Disc.: SpacewatchAlt.: 2012 GQ6 || 
|- id="1998 TC24" bgcolor=#fefefe
| 0 ||  || MBA-I || 18.6 || data-sort-value="0.57" | 570 m || multiple || 1998–2021 || 07 Sep 2021 || 58 || align=left | Disc.: SpacewatchAdded on 30 September 2021Alt.: 2006 VX123, 2015 AC71, 2021 PK48 || 
|- id="1998 TR24" bgcolor=#d6d6d6
| 0 ||  || MBA-O || 16.64 || 2.6 km || multiple || 1998–2022 || 27 Jan 2022 || 141 || align=left | Disc.: Spacewatch || 
|- id="1998 TA25" bgcolor=#E9E9E9
| 0 ||  || MBA-M || 17.93 || 1.4 km || multiple || 1998–2021 || 30 Nov 2021 || 76 || align=left | Disc.: SpacewatchAdded on 22 July 2020 || 
|- id="1998 TH25" bgcolor=#fefefe
| 0 ||  || MBA-I || 19.0 || data-sort-value="0.47" | 470 m || multiple || 1998–2021 || 31 Oct 2021 || 33 || align=left | —Added on 29 January 2022 || 
|- id="1998 TV25" bgcolor=#fefefe
| 1 ||  || MBA-I || 18.3 || data-sort-value="0.65" | 650 m || multiple || 1998–2017 || 07 Dec 2017 || 53 || align=left | Disc.: Spacewatch || 
|- id="1998 TF26" bgcolor=#fefefe
| 0 ||  || MBA-I || 17.88 || data-sort-value="0.79" | 790 m || multiple || 1998–2021 || 27 Oct 2021 || 85 || align=left | Disc.: Spacewatch || 
|- id="1998 TE28" bgcolor=#E9E9E9
| 1 ||  || MBA-M || 18.6 || data-sort-value="0.80" | 800 m || multiple || 1998–2020 || 15 Dec 2020 || 79 || align=left | Disc.: SpacewatchAdded on 17 January 2021Alt.: 2016 YV19 || 
|- id="1998 TW28" bgcolor=#fefefe
| 1 ||  || MBA-I || 18.6 || data-sort-value="0.57" | 570 m || multiple || 1998–2019 || 27 Sep 2019 || 52 || align=left | Disc.: SpacewatchAlt.: 2012 QN47 || 
|- id="1998 TA29" bgcolor=#d6d6d6
| 0 ||  || MBA-O || 17.2 || 2.0 km || multiple || 1998–2019 || 19 Nov 2019 || 62 || align=left | Disc.: SpacewatchAdded on 21 August 2021Alt.: 2003 SB357, 2019 RN15 || 
|- id="1998 TR29" bgcolor=#C2FFFF
| 0 ||  || JT || 13.89 || 9.3 km || multiple || 1998–2021 || 08 Nov 2021 || 92 || align=left | Disc.: SpacewatchAdded on 17 June 2021Greek camp (L4)Alt.: 2020 QV72 || 
|- id="1998 TE36" bgcolor=#fefefe
| 0 ||  || MBA-I || 18.09 || data-sort-value="0.72" | 720 m || multiple || 1998–2022 || 26 Jan 2022 || 113 || align=left | Disc.: Xinglong Stn.Alt.: 2013 WJ26 || 
|- id="1998 TT38" bgcolor=#d6d6d6
| 0 ||  || MBA-O || 16.5 || 2.8 km || multiple || 1998–2020 || 16 Nov 2020 || 93 || align=left | Disc.: Spacewatch || 
|- id="1998 TU38" bgcolor=#fefefe
| 0 ||  || MBA-I || 18.8 || data-sort-value="0.52" | 520 m || multiple || 1998–2018 || 07 Aug 2018 || 38 || align=left | Disc.: Spacewatch || 
|- id="1998 TV38" bgcolor=#fefefe
| 0 ||  || MBA-I || 18.93 || data-sort-value="0.49" | 490 m || multiple || 1998–2021 || 07 Jan 2021 || 127 || align=left | Disc.: Spacewatch || 
|}
back to top

U 

|- id="1998 UR" bgcolor=#FFC2E0
| 8 || 1998 UR || AMO || 22.7 || data-sort-value="0.10" | 100 m || single || 11 days || 27 Oct 1998 || 23 || align=left | Disc.: LINEAR || 
|- id="1998 UM1" bgcolor=#FFC2E0
| 1 ||  || AMO || 23.4 || data-sort-value="0.074" | 74 m || multiple || 1998–2018 || 19 Nov 2018 || 65 || align=left | Disc.: LINEARAlt.: 2018 RP4 || 
|- id="1998 UQ1" bgcolor=#FFE699
| 0 ||  || Asteroid || 16.79 || 1.9 km || multiple || 1998–2021 || 06 Dec 2021 || 300 || align=left | Disc.: LINEARMCA at MPC || 
|- id="1998 UK2" bgcolor=#fefefe
| 0 ||  || MBA-I || 18.2 || data-sort-value="0.68" | 680 m || multiple || 1998–2021 || 08 Jun 2021 || 96 || align=left | Disc.: ODAS || 
|- id="1998 UH10" bgcolor=#d6d6d6
| 1 ||  || MBA-O || 17.2 || 2.0 km || multiple || 1998–2019 || 08 Jan 2019 || 38 || align=left | Disc.: Spacewatch || 
|- id="1998 UO10" bgcolor=#d6d6d6
| 0 ||  || MBA-O || 16.6 || 2.7 km || multiple || 1998–2021 || 17 Jan 2021 || 106 || align=left | Disc.: SpacewatchAlt.: 2014 WC40 || 
|- id="1998 UR11" bgcolor=#E9E9E9
| 2 ||  || MBA-M || 18.7 || data-sort-value="0.54" | 540 m || multiple || 1998–2018 || 13 Sep 2018 || 56 || align=left | Disc.: Spacewatch || 
|- id="1998 UF13" bgcolor=#E9E9E9
| 0 ||  || MBA-M || 16.9 || 1.8 km || multiple || 1998–2021 || 14 Jan 2021 || 116 || align=left | Disc.: SpacewatchAlt.: 2015 TU292 || 
|- id="1998 UG13" bgcolor=#d6d6d6
| – ||  || MBA-O || 18.1 || 1.3 km || single || 9 days || 23 Oct 1998 || 9 || align=left | Disc.: Spacewatch || 
|- id="1998 UP13" bgcolor=#E9E9E9
| 1 ||  || MBA-M || 17.2 || 1.1 km || multiple || 1998–2020 || 18 Apr 2020 || 141 || align=left | Disc.: SpacewatchAlt.: 2015 XM170 || 
|- id="1998 US18" bgcolor=#FFC2E0
| 2 ||  || APO || 20.9 || data-sort-value="0.23" | 230 m || multiple || 1998–2019 || 28 Nov 2019 || 68 || align=left | Disc.: SpacewatchPotentially hazardous objectAlt.: 2019 VC1 || 
|- id="1998 UY24" bgcolor=#FFC2E0
| 8 ||  || APO || 21.6 || data-sort-value="0.17" | 170 m || single || 10 days || 08 Nov 1998 || 16 || align=left | Disc.: LINEAR || 
|- id="1998 UR43" bgcolor=#C2E0FF
| 2 ||  || TNO || 8.3 || 103 km || multiple || 1998–2017 || 23 Dec 2017 || 38 || align=left | Disc.: Kitt PeakLoUTNOs, plutino, BR-mag: 1.27; taxonomy: BR || 
|- id="1998 UF45" bgcolor=#E9E9E9
| 0 ||  || MBA-M || 17.59 || 1.7 km || multiple || 1998–2021 || 27 Nov 2021 || 101 || align=left | Disc.: Spacewatch || 
|- id="1998 UO46" bgcolor=#fefefe
| 1 ||  || MBA-I || 18.6 || data-sort-value="0.57" | 570 m || multiple || 1998–2020 || 16 Dec 2020 || 48 || align=left | Disc.: Spacewatch || 
|- id="1998 UX47" bgcolor=#E9E9E9
| 0 ||  || MBA-M || 17.2 || 1.1 km || multiple || 1998–2019 || 03 Dec 2019 || 109 || align=left | Disc.: SpacewatchAlt.: 2010 JK133, 2013 CB223, 2014 OF315 || 
|- id="1998 UD50" bgcolor=#E9E9E9
| 0 ||  || MBA-M || 17.24 || 2.0 km || multiple || 1998–2021 || 30 Nov 2021 || 127 || align=left | Disc.: SpacewatchAdded on 22 July 2020 || 
|- id="1998 UZ50" bgcolor=#E9E9E9
| 0 ||  || MBA-M || 17.9 || 1.1 km || multiple || 1998–2021 || 18 Jan 2021 || 90 || align=left | Disc.: SpacewatchAlt.: 2005 JT6, 2015 VQ14 || 
|- id="1998 UB51" bgcolor=#fefefe
| 0 ||  || MBA-I || 18.7 || data-sort-value="0.54" | 540 m || multiple || 1998–2020 || 24 Nov 2020 || 77 || align=left | Disc.: Spacewatch || 
|- id="1998 UC51" bgcolor=#fefefe
| 0 ||  || MBA-I || 18.4 || data-sort-value="0.62" | 620 m || multiple || 1998–2021 || 08 Jun 2021 || 77 || align=left | Disc.: Spacewatch || 
|- id="1998 UF51" bgcolor=#d6d6d6
| 0 ||  || MBA-O || 17.0 || 2.2 km || multiple || 1998–2020 || 16 Mar 2020 || 72 || align=left | Disc.: SpacewatchAlt.: 2008 WR112 || 
|- id="1998 UG51" bgcolor=#fefefe
| 1 ||  || MBA-I || 18.5 || data-sort-value="0.59" | 590 m || multiple || 1998–2021 || 10 Jan 2021 || 66 || align=left | Disc.: Spacewatch || 
|- id="1998 UH51" bgcolor=#E9E9E9
| 2 ||  || MBA-M || 17.8 || 1.2 km || multiple || 1998–2015 || 14 Dec 2015 || 26 || align=left | Disc.: Spacewatch || 
|- id="1998 UJ51" bgcolor=#d6d6d6
| 0 ||  || MBA-O || 16.9 || 2.3 km || multiple || 1998–2021 || 16 Jan 2021 || 83 || align=left | Disc.: Spacewatch || 
|- id="1998 UK51" bgcolor=#d6d6d6
| 0 ||  || MBA-O || 17.2 || 2.0 km || multiple || 1998–2020 || 26 Apr 2020 || 72 || align=left | Disc.: Spacewatch || 
|- id="1998 UL51" bgcolor=#fefefe
| 0 ||  || MBA-I || 18.05 || data-sort-value="0.73" | 730 m || multiple || 1998–2021 || 30 Oct 2021 || 153 || align=left | Disc.: Spacewatch || 
|- id="1998 UM51" bgcolor=#fefefe
| 1 ||  || MBA-I || 18.2 || data-sort-value="0.68" | 680 m || multiple || 1998–2019 || 25 Oct 2019 || 59 || align=left | Disc.: ODAS || 
|- id="1998 UN51" bgcolor=#fefefe
| 0 ||  || MBA-I || 18.26 || data-sort-value="0.66" | 660 m || multiple || 1998–2021 || 29 Dec 2021 || 43 || align=left | Disc.: Spacewatch || 
|- id="1998 UO51" bgcolor=#fefefe
| 2 ||  || MBA-I || 19.36 || data-sort-value="0.40" | 400 m || multiple || 1998–2021 || 08 Dec 2021 || 36 || align=left | Disc.: Spacewatch || 
|- id="1998 UP51" bgcolor=#d6d6d6
| 0 ||  || MBA-O || 16.3 || 3.1 km || multiple || 1998–2020 || 05 Nov 2020 || 100 || align=left | Disc.: Spacewatch || 
|- id="1998 UQ51" bgcolor=#d6d6d6
| 2 ||  || MBA-O || 17.3 || 1.9 km || multiple || 1998–2018 || 14 Sep 2018 || 62 || align=left | Disc.: Spacewatch || 
|- id="1998 UR51" bgcolor=#fefefe
| 0 ||  || MBA-I || 17.55 || data-sort-value="0.92" | 920 m || multiple || 1998–2021 || 24 Oct 2021 || 75 || align=left | Disc.: DB MissingAdded on 19 October 2020 || 
|- id="1998 US51" bgcolor=#d6d6d6
| 1 ||  || MBA-O || 17.6 || 1.7 km || multiple || 1998–2020 || 10 Dec 2020 || 51 || align=left | Disc.: SpacewatchAdded on 17 January 2021 || 
|- id="1998 UT51" bgcolor=#E9E9E9
| 0 ||  || MBA-M || 18.2 || data-sort-value="0.96" | 960 m || multiple || 1998–2021 || 12 Jan 2021 || 40 || align=left | Disc.: SpacewatchAdded on 17 January 2021 || 
|- id="1998 UU51" bgcolor=#E9E9E9
| 0 ||  || MBA-M || 18.3 || data-sort-value="0.92" | 920 m || multiple || 1998–2020 || 10 Dec 2020 || 45 || align=left | Disc.: No observationsAdded on 17 January 2021 || 
|- id="1998 UV51" bgcolor=#fefefe
| 0 ||  || MBA-I || 18.3 || data-sort-value="0.65" | 650 m || multiple || 1998–2021 || 15 Apr 2021 || 51 || align=left | Disc.: DB MissingAdded on 17 June 2021 || 
|}
back to top

V 

|- id="1998 VP" bgcolor=#FFC2E0
| 2 || 1998 VP || AMO || 19.1 || data-sort-value="0.54" | 540 m || multiple || 1998–2020 || 26 May 2020 || 77 || align=left | Disc.: LINEAR || 
|- id="1998 VQ" bgcolor=#FA8072
| 4 || 1998 VQ || MCA || 19.4 || data-sort-value="0.39" | 390 m || multiple || 1998–2011 || 03 Nov 2011 || 64 || align=left | Disc.: LINEARAlt.: 2011 VM1 || 
|- id="1998 VS" bgcolor=#FFC2E0
| 1 || 1998 VS || APO || 22.3 || data-sort-value="0.12" | 120 m || multiple || 1998–2019 || 05 Feb 2019 || 67 || align=left | Disc.: LINEARAMO at MPC || 
|- id="1998 VE31" bgcolor=#FFC2E0
| 5 ||  || APO || 20.9 || data-sort-value="0.23" | 230 m || multiple || 1998–2012 || 02 Dec 2012 || 95 || align=left | Disc.: LINEAR || 
|- id="1998 VD32" bgcolor=#FFC2E0
| 0 ||  || APO || 22.65 || data-sort-value="0.10" | 100 m || multiple || 1998–2020 || 25 Nov 2020 || 135 || align=left | Disc.: LINEARAlt.: 2020 SS7 || 
|- id="1998 VP40" bgcolor=#d6d6d6
| 0 ||  || MBA-O || 16.9 || 2.7 km || multiple || 1998–2021 || 05 Jan 2021 || 85 || align=left | Disc.: SpacewatchAlt.: 2010 EG6 || 
|- id="1998 VE41" bgcolor=#fefefe
| 0 ||  || MBA-I || 17.30 || 1.0 km || multiple || 1994–2021 || 05 Nov 2021 || 245 || align=left | Disc.: SpacewatchAlt.: 2008 FA43, 2010 XN15 || 
|- id="1998 VQ41" bgcolor=#E9E9E9
| 0 ||  || MBA-M || 17.45 || data-sort-value="0.96" | 960 m || multiple || 1998–2021 || 11 May 2021 || 83 || align=left | Disc.: SpacewatchAdded on 22 July 2020 || 
|- id="1998 VE42" bgcolor=#fefefe
| 0 ||  || MBA-I || 17.87 || data-sort-value="0.79" | 790 m || multiple || 1998–2021 || 30 Oct 2021 || 74 || align=left | Disc.: SpacewatchAdded on 5 November 2021Alt.: 2021 LY23 || 
|- id="1998 VH42" bgcolor=#E9E9E9
| 0 ||  || MBA-M || 18.1 || 1.0 km || multiple || 1998–2019 || 20 Dec 2019 || 79 || align=left | Disc.: SpacewatchAlt.: 2002 RC174 || 
|- id="1998 VF57" bgcolor=#E9E9E9
| 0 ||  || MBA-M || 18.2 || data-sort-value="0.96" | 960 m || multiple || 1998–2019 || 29 Oct 2019 || 56 || align=left | Disc.: SpacewatchAlt.: 2015 TS391 || 
|- id="1998 VH57" bgcolor=#C2FFFF
| 0 ||  || JT || 13.88 || 9.3 km || multiple || 1998–2021 || 24 Nov 2021 || 173 || align=left | Disc.: SpacewatchGreek camp (L4) || 
|- id="1998 VJ57" bgcolor=#d6d6d6
| 0 ||  || MBA-O || 16.8 || 2.4 km || multiple || 1998–2020 || 26 Apr 2020 || 106 || align=left | Disc.: Spacewatch || 
|- id="1998 VK57" bgcolor=#fefefe
| 0 ||  || MBA-I || 18.6 || data-sort-value="0.57" | 570 m || multiple || 1998–2020 || 14 Dec 2020 || 83 || align=left | Disc.: Spacewatch || 
|- id="1998 VL57" bgcolor=#fefefe
| 1 ||  || MBA-I || 18.5 || data-sort-value="0.59" | 590 m || multiple || 1998–2021 || 17 Jan 2021 || 50 || align=left | Disc.: Spacewatch || 
|- id="1998 VM57" bgcolor=#E9E9E9
| 0 ||  || MBA-M || 17.9 || 1.1 km || multiple || 1998–2019 || 05 Sep 2019 || 38 || align=left | Disc.: SpacewatchAdded on 22 July 2020 || 
|- id="1998 VN57" bgcolor=#d6d6d6
| 0 ||  || MBA-O || 17.0 || 2.2 km || multiple || 1998–2021 || 18 Mar 2021 || 46 || align=left | Disc.: SpacewatchAdded on 24 December 2021 || 
|}
back to top

W 

|- id="1998 WY1" bgcolor=#FFC2E0
| 7 ||  || AMO || 21.9 || data-sort-value="0.15" | 150 m || single || 12 days || 28 Nov 1998 || 30 || align=left | Disc.: LINEAR || 
|- id="1998 WA2" bgcolor=#FFC2E0
| 0 ||  || AMO || 19.8 || data-sort-value="0.39" | 390 m || multiple || 1998–2021 || 07 Jan 2021 || 214 || align=left | Disc.: LINEARAlt.: 2020 PE || 
|- id="1998 WB2" bgcolor=#FFC2E0
| 0 ||  || APO || 21.8 || data-sort-value="0.150" | 150 m || multiple || 1998–2010 || 16 May 2010 || 208 || align=left | Disc.: LINEARPotentially hazardous objectAlt.: 2010 GJ7 || 
|- id="1998 WL4" bgcolor=#FFC2E0
| 2 ||  || APO || 19.5 || data-sort-value="0.45" | 450 m || multiple || 1998–2019 || 30 Nov 2019 || 83 || align=left | Disc.: Spacewatch || 
|- id="1998 WR5" bgcolor=#FFC2E0
| 6 ||  || AMO || 18.5 || data-sort-value="0.71" | 710 m || single || 28 days || 17 Dec 1998 || 48 || align=left | Disc.: LINEAR || 
|- id="1998 WS5" bgcolor=#FA8072
| 2 ||  || MCA || 18.6 || data-sort-value="0.57" | 570 m || multiple || 1990–2002 || 23 Nov 2002 || 76 || align=left | Disc.: LINEAR || 
|- id="1998 WG24" bgcolor=#C2E0FF
| 4 ||  || TNO || 6.75 || 148 km || multiple || 1998–2021 || 01 Dec 2021 || 47 || align=left | Disc.: Kitt PeakLoUTNOs, cubewano (cold) || 
|- id="1998 WU24" bgcolor=#C7FF8F
| 3 ||  || CEN || 15.0 || 6.0 km || single || 87 days || 20 Feb 1999 || 62 || align=left | Disc.: LINEAR, BR-mag: 1.31MCA at MPC || 
|- id="1998 WV24" bgcolor=#C2E0FF
| 3 ||  || TNO || 7.4 || 104 km || multiple || 1998–2020 || 14 Nov 2020 || 26 || align=left | Disc.: Kitt PeakLoUTNOs, other TNO, BR-mag: 1.27; taxonomy: BR; binary: 91 km || 
|- id="1998 WX24" bgcolor=#C2E0FF
| 2 ||  || TNO || 6.7 || 152 km || multiple || 1998–2018 || 09 Dec 2018 || 35 || align=left | Disc.: Kitt PeakLoUTNOs, cubewano (cold), BR-mag: 1.79; taxonomy: RR || 
|- id="1998 WY24" bgcolor=#C2E0FF
| 3 ||  || TNO || 6.82 || 144 km || multiple || 1998–2021 || 01 Dec 2021 || 39 || align=left | Disc.: Kitt PeakLoUTNOs, cubewano (cold) || 
|- id="1998 WZ24" bgcolor=#C2E0FF
| E ||  || TNO || 8.1 || 113 km || single || 65 days || 22 Jan 1999 || 6 || align=left | Disc.: Kitt PeakLoUTNOs, plutino? || 
|- id="1998 WN26" bgcolor=#d6d6d6
| 0 ||  || MBA-O || 16.7 || 2.5 km || multiple || 1998–2021 || 08 Jan 2021 || 106 || align=left | Disc.: Spacewatch || 
|- id="1998 WR26" bgcolor=#d6d6d6
| 0 ||  || MBA-O || 17.18 || 2.0 km || multiple || 1998–2020 || 21 Apr 2020 || 68 || align=left | Disc.: SpacewatchAlt.: 2015 DQ163 || 
|- id="1998 WY27" bgcolor=#E9E9E9
| 0 ||  || MBA-M || 18.1 || 1.0 km || multiple || 1998–2021 || 07 Jan 2021 || 38 || align=left | Disc.: SpacewatchAlt.: 2011 WP60 || 
|- id="1998 WG28" bgcolor=#d6d6d6
| 0 ||  || MBA-O || 16.61 || 2.7 km || multiple || 1998–2021 || 06 Jan 2021 || 155 || align=left | Disc.: SpacewatchAlt.: 2014 WB242 || 
|- id="1998 WN29" bgcolor=#E9E9E9
| 0 ||  || MBA-M || 17.84 || data-sort-value="0.80" | 800 m || multiple || 1998–2021 || 15 Apr 2021 || 83 || align=left | Disc.: Spacewatch || 
|- id="1998 WR29" bgcolor=#E9E9E9
| 0 ||  || MBA-M || 17.0 || 2.2 km || multiple || 1998–2021 || 30 Nov 2021 || 73 || align=left | Disc.: SpacewatchAdded on 24 December 2021 || 
|- id="1998 WS31" bgcolor=#C2E0FF
| 3 ||  || TNO || 8.26 || 105 km || multiple || 1998–2021 || 11 Jan 2021 || 33 || align=left | Disc.: Kitt PeakLoUTNOs, plutino, BR-mag: 1.32; taxonomy: IR-BR || 
|- id="1998 WV31" bgcolor=#C2E0FF
| 2 ||  || TNO || 7.5 || 150 km || multiple || 1998–2017 || 20 Dec 2017 || 28 || align=left | Disc.: Kitt PeakLoUTNOs, plutino, BR-mag: 1.31; taxonomy: BR || 
|- id="1998 WW31" bgcolor=#C2E0FF
| 2 ||  || TNO || 6.7 || 148 km || multiple || 1998–2019 || 26 Oct 2019 || 38 || align=left | Disc.: Kitt PeakLoUTNOs, cubewano (hot), albedo: 0.054; binary: 123 km || 
|- id="1998 WX31" bgcolor=#C2E0FF
| 1 ||  || TNO || 6.8 || 145 km || multiple || 1998–2017 || 20 Dec 2017 || 37 || align=left | Disc.: Kitt PeakLoUTNOs, cubewano (cold) || 
|- id="1998 WY31" bgcolor=#C2E0FF
| 5 ||  || TNO || 6.98 || 132 km || multiple || 1998–2023 || 29 Feb 2023 || 29 || align=left | Disc.: Kitt PeakLoUTNOs, cubewano (cold) || 
|- id="1998 WZ31" bgcolor=#C2E0FF
| 4 ||  || TNO || 8.21 || 108 km || multiple || 1998–2021 || 01 Dec 2021 || 29 || align=left | Disc.: Kitt PeakLoUTNOs, plutino, BR-mag: 1.26; taxonomy: BB-BR || 
|- id="1998 WE35" bgcolor=#E9E9E9
| 0 ||  || MBA-M || 17.22 || 2.0 km || multiple || 1998–2021 || 24 Nov 2021 || 71 || align=left | Disc.: Spacewatch || 
|- id="1998 WF36" bgcolor=#fefefe
| 0 ||  || MBA-I || 18.5 || data-sort-value="0.59" | 590 m || multiple || 1998–2020 || 05 Nov 2020 || 79 || align=left | Disc.: SpacewatchAdded on 17 January 2021Alt.: 2005 NQ88 || 
|- id="1998 WZ36" bgcolor=#fefefe
| 0 ||  || MBA-I || 18.1 || data-sort-value="0.71" | 710 m || multiple || 1998–2020 || 08 Nov 2020 || 75 || align=left | Disc.: SpacewatchAdded on 22 July 2020 || 
|- id="1998 WL37" bgcolor=#E9E9E9
| 1 ||  || MBA-M || 17.3 || 1.9 km || multiple || 1998–2020 || 20 Dec 2020 || 138 || align=left | Disc.: Spacewatch || 
|- id="1998 WZ37" bgcolor=#E9E9E9
| 0 ||  || MBA-M || 17.21 || 1.1 km || multiple || 1998–2021 || 05 Jun 2021 || 154 || align=left | Disc.: Spacewatch || 
|- id="1998 WP38" bgcolor=#d6d6d6
| 0 ||  || MBA-O || 16.0 || 3.5 km || multiple || 1998–2021 || 06 Jan 2021 || 146 || align=left | Disc.: SpacewatchAlt.: 2014 RL15, 2015 XW180 || 
|- id="1998 WQ38" bgcolor=#C2FFFF
| 0 ||  || JT || 14.30 || 7.7 km || multiple || 1998–2021 || 02 Dec 2021 || 123 || align=left | Disc.: SpacewatchGreek camp (L4)Alt.: 2009 SY403 || 
|- id="1998 WE39" bgcolor=#fefefe
| 0 ||  = (619170) || MBA-I || 17.6 || data-sort-value="0.90" | 900 m || multiple || 1998–2021 || 12 Jun 2021 || 179 || align=left | Disc.: SpacewatchAlt.: 2015 TQ200 || 
|- id="1998 WW39" bgcolor=#fefefe
| 1 ||  || MBA-I || 18.7 || data-sort-value="0.54" | 540 m || multiple || 1998–2019 || 28 Nov 2019 || 60 || align=left | Disc.: SpacewatchAlt.: 2017 BK116 || 
|- id="1998 WG40" bgcolor=#E9E9E9
| 0 ||  || MBA-M || 16.94 || 2.3 km || multiple || 1998–2021 || 09 Dec 2021 || 135 || align=left | Disc.: Spacewatch || 
|- id="1998 WK42" bgcolor=#d6d6d6
| 0 ||  || MBA-O || 16.11 || 3.3 km || multiple || 1998–2021 || 30 Nov 2021 || 178 || align=left | Disc.: ODASAlt.: 2003 SV89, 2009 UV58, 2016 AY86 || 
|- id="1998 WY42" bgcolor=#d6d6d6
| 0 ||  || MBA-O || 17.1 || 2.1 km || multiple || 1998–2020 || 11 Dec 2020 || 74 || align=left | Disc.: Spacewatch || 
|- id="1998 WC43" bgcolor=#d6d6d6
| 0 ||  || MBA-O || 17.2 || 2.0 km || multiple || 1998–2020 || 14 Nov 2020 || 40 || align=left | Disc.: SpacewatchAdded on 17 January 2021Alt.: 2014 SC50 || 
|- id="1998 WD43" bgcolor=#C2FFFF
| 0 ||  || JT || 14.84 || 6.0 km || multiple || 1998–2021 || 30 Nov 2021 || 94 || align=left | Disc.: SpacewatchAdded on 17 January 2021Greek camp (L4)Alt.: 2020 RE30 || 
|- id="1998 WH43" bgcolor=#E9E9E9
| 0 ||  || MBA-M || 17.4 || data-sort-value="0.98" | 980 m || multiple || 1998–2021 || 12 Jun 2021 || 118 || align=left | Disc.: SpacewatchAlt.: 2016 BB12 || 
|- id="1998 WE44" bgcolor=#d6d6d6
| 0 ||  || MBA-O || 17.03 || 2.2 km || multiple || 1998–2021 || 03 Apr 2021 || 196 || align=left | Disc.: La Palma Obs. || 
|- id="1998 WJ44" bgcolor=#E9E9E9
| 2 ||  || MBA-M || 18.96 || data-sort-value="0.48" | 480 m || multiple || 1998–2019 || 03 Dec 2019 || 24 || align=left | Disc.: La Palma Obs.Added on 22 July 2020 || 
|- id="1998 WK44" bgcolor=#C2FFFF
| E ||  || JT || 14.5 || 7.0 km || single || 5 days || 22 Nov 1998 || 9 || align=left | Disc.: La Palma Obs.Greek camp (L4) || 
|- id="1998 WL44" bgcolor=#E9E9E9
| 1 ||  || MBA-M || 18.4 || data-sort-value="0.62" | 620 m || multiple || 1998–2020 || 03 Jan 2020 || 44 || align=left | Disc.: La Palma Obs.Added on 22 July 2020Alt.: 2002 RJ301 || 
|- id="1998 WT44" bgcolor=#E9E9E9
| 0 ||  || MBA-M || 16.90 || 1.2 km || multiple || 1998–2021 || 13 Jul 2021 || 200 || align=left | Disc.: La Palma Obs.Alt.: 2008 JF3, 2017 OX9 || 
|- id="1998 WV44" bgcolor=#E9E9E9
| 0 ||  || MBA-M || 17.40 || 1.8 km || multiple || 1998–2022 || 07 Jan 2022 || 130 || align=left | Disc.: La Palma Obs.Alt.: 2015 PX177 || 
|- id="1998 WA45" bgcolor=#E9E9E9
| 0 ||  || MBA-M || 17.00 || 1.7 km || multiple || 1998–2021 || 17 Apr 2021 || 143 || align=left | Disc.: La Palma Obs. || 
|- id="1998 WF45" bgcolor=#fefefe
| 0 ||  || MBA-I || 18.5 || data-sort-value="0.59" | 590 m || multiple || 1998–2021 || 18 Jan 2021 || 52 || align=left | Disc.: La Palma Obs.Added on 24 August 2020 || 
|- id="1998 WL45" bgcolor=#fefefe
| 1 ||  || MBA-I || 18.4 || data-sort-value="0.62" | 620 m || multiple || 1998–2021 || 09 Apr 2021 || 38 || align=left | Disc.: La Palma Obs.Added on 30 September 2021 || 
|- id="1998 WH46" bgcolor=#E9E9E9
| 2 ||  || MBA-M || 18.4 || data-sort-value="0.62" | 620 m || multiple || 1998–2018 || 08 Aug 2018 || 23 || align=left | Disc.: SpacewatchAdded on 17 January 2021 || 
|- id="1998 WJ46" bgcolor=#fefefe
| 0 ||  || MBA-I || 18.51 || data-sort-value="0.59" | 590 m || multiple || 1998–2021 || 30 Nov 2021 || 125 || align=left | Disc.: SpacewatchAdded on 5 November 2021 || 
|- id="1998 WK46" bgcolor=#E9E9E9
| 0 ||  || MBA-M || 17.79 || data-sort-value="0.82" | 820 m || multiple || 1998–2021 || 14 May 2021 || 95 || align=left | Disc.: Spacewatch || 
|- id="1998 WL46" bgcolor=#E9E9E9
| 0 ||  || MBA-M || 17.63 || 1.7 km || multiple || 1998–2021 || 27 Nov 2021 || 99 || align=left | Disc.: Spacewatch || 
|- id="1998 WM46" bgcolor=#C2FFFF
| 0 ||  || JT || 14.16 || 8.2 km || multiple || 1998–2021 || 09 Dec 2021 || 142 || align=left | Disc.: SpacewatchGreek camp (L4) || 
|- id="1998 WO46" bgcolor=#fefefe
| 0 ||  || MBA-I || 18.98 || data-sort-value="0.48" | 480 m || multiple || 1998–2022 || 06 Jan 2022 || 58 || align=left | Disc.: Spacewatch || 
|- id="1998 WP46" bgcolor=#fefefe
| 0 ||  || MBA-I || 18.79 || data-sort-value="0.52" | 520 m || multiple || 1998–2021 || 03 Oct 2021 || 79 || align=left | Disc.: Spacewatch || 
|- id="1998 WQ46" bgcolor=#E9E9E9
| 1 ||  || MBA-M || 18.3 || data-sort-value="0.65" | 650 m || multiple || 1998–2020 || 24 Jan 2020 || 61 || align=left | Disc.: Spacewatch || 
|- id="1998 WR46" bgcolor=#fefefe
| 0 ||  || MBA-I || 18.9 || data-sort-value="0.49" | 490 m || multiple || 1998–2018 || 15 Oct 2018 || 49 || align=left | Disc.: Spacewatch || 
|- id="1998 WS46" bgcolor=#fefefe
| 0 ||  || MBA-I || 18.4 || data-sort-value="0.62" | 620 m || multiple || 1998–2020 || 23 Jan 2020 || 59 || align=left | Disc.: Spacewatch || 
|- id="1998 WT46" bgcolor=#fefefe
| 0 ||  || MBA-I || 18.32 || data-sort-value="0.64" | 640 m || multiple || 1998–2021 || 11 May 2021 || 67 || align=left | Disc.: Spacewatch || 
|- id="1998 WU46" bgcolor=#fefefe
| 0 ||  || HUN || 19.03 || data-sort-value="0.46" | 460 m || multiple || 1998–2021 || 15 Sep 2021 || 48 || align=left | Disc.: Spacewatch || 
|- id="1998 WV46" bgcolor=#d6d6d6
| 0 ||  || MBA-O || 17.50 || 1.8 km || multiple || 1998–2021 || 17 Apr 2021 || 60 || align=left | Disc.: Spacewatch || 
|- id="1998 WW46" bgcolor=#fefefe
| 1 ||  || MBA-I || 18.7 || data-sort-value="0.54" | 540 m || multiple || 1998–2021 || 04 Jan 2021 || 60 || align=left | Disc.: Spacewatch || 
|- id="1998 WX46" bgcolor=#C2FFFF
| 0 ||  || JT || 14.74 || 6.3 km || multiple || 1998–2021 || 26 Oct 2021 || 56 || align=left | Disc.: SpacewatchGreek camp (L4) || 
|}
back to top

X 

|- id="1998 XD9" bgcolor=#FA8072
| 1 ||  || MCA || 17.8 || data-sort-value="0.82" | 820 m || multiple || 1998–2020 || 21 May 2020 || 158 || align=left | Disc.: LINEAR || 
|- id="1998 XD12" bgcolor=#FFC2E0
| 6 ||  || APO || 20.7 || data-sort-value="0.26" | 260 m || single || 10 days || 24 Dec 1998 || 59 || align=left | Disc.: LINEARPotentially hazardous object || 
|- id="1998 XN17" bgcolor=#FFC2E0
| 4 ||  || ATE || 22.8 || data-sort-value="0.098" | 98 m || multiple || 1998–2004 || 24 Mar 2004 || 36 || align=left | Disc.: LINEAR || 
|- id="1998 XT18" bgcolor=#fefefe
| 0 ||  || MBA-I || 18.11 || data-sort-value="0.71" | 710 m || multiple || 1998–2021 || 18 Mar 2021 || 34 || align=left | Disc.: SpacewatchAdded on 24 December 2021 || 
|- id="1998 XR19" bgcolor=#d6d6d6
| 0 ||  || MBA-O || 16.06 || 3.4 km || multiple || 1998–2021 || 15 Apr 2021 || 161 || align=left | Disc.: SpacewatchAlt.: 2015 BO18, 2016 GK145 || 
|- id="1998 XW22" bgcolor=#E9E9E9
| 0 ||  || MBA-M || 17.1 || 1.6 km || multiple || 1998–2021 || 15 Jan 2021 || 139 || align=left | Disc.: SpacewatchAlt.: 2011 YM71, 2015 XK75 || 
|- id="1998 XY22" bgcolor=#fefefe
| 0 ||  || MBA-I || 17.53 || data-sort-value="0.93" | 930 m || multiple || 1998–2022 || 27 Jan 2022 || 128 || align=left | Disc.: Spacewatch || 
|- id="1998 XX24" bgcolor=#E9E9E9
| 0 ||  || MBA-M || 17.8 || data-sort-value="0.82" | 820 m || multiple || 1998–2020 || 14 Feb 2020 || 120 || align=left | Disc.: Spacewatch || 
|}
back to top

Y 

|- id="1998 YG10" bgcolor=#FA8072
| 5 ||  || MCA || 19.2 || data-sort-value="0.43" | 430 m || single || 120 days || 17 Jan 1999 || 29 || align=left | Disc.: Spacewatch || 
|- id="1998 YO19" bgcolor=#E9E9E9
| 0 ||  || MBA-M || 17.8 || 1.2 km || multiple || 1998–2021 || 08 Jun 2021 || 71 || align=left | Disc.: SpacewatchAlt.: 2012 BV47 || 
|- id="1998 YO21" bgcolor=#E9E9E9
| 1 ||  || MBA-M || 17.8 || 1.2 km || multiple || 1998–2020 || 25 Jan 2020 || 80 || align=left | Disc.: Spacewatch || 
|- id="1998 YV27" bgcolor=#fefefe
| 1 ||  || MBA-I || 19.2 || data-sort-value="0.43" | 430 m || multiple || 1998–2020 || 11 Oct 2020 || 43 || align=left | Disc.: La Palma Obs.Added on 9 March 2021Alt.: 2020 QU11 || 
|- id="1998 YV33" bgcolor=#E9E9E9
| 0 ||  || MBA-M || 17.09 || 1.6 km || multiple || 1998–2021 || 08 Jul 2021 || 128 || align=left | Disc.: Spacewatch || 
|- id="1998 YY33" bgcolor=#fefefe
| 0 ||  || MBA-I || 17.9 || data-sort-value="0.78" | 780 m || multiple || 1998–2020 || 15 Dec 2020 || 79 || align=left | Disc.: Spacewatch || 
|- id="1998 YZ33" bgcolor=#fefefe
| 0 ||  || MBA-I || 18.0 || data-sort-value="0.75" | 750 m || multiple || 1998–2021 || 18 Jan 2021 || 88 || align=left | Disc.: Spacewatch || 
|- id="1998 YA34" bgcolor=#d6d6d6
| 0 ||  || MBA-O || 16.9 || 2.3 km || multiple || 1998–2020 || 26 Apr 2020 || 84 || align=left | Disc.: Spacewatch || 
|- id="1998 YB34" bgcolor=#E9E9E9
| 0 ||  || MBA-M || 17.1 || 2.1 km || multiple || 1998–2020 || 06 Dec 2020 || 85 || align=left | Disc.: Spacewatch || 
|- id="1998 YC34" bgcolor=#E9E9E9
| 0 ||  || MBA-M || 17.67 || 1.2 km || multiple || 1998–2021 || 12 May 2021 || 73 || align=left | Disc.: Spacewatch || 
|}
back to top

References 
 

Lists of unnumbered minor planets